= Star Time (album) =

Box set by James Brown
- Released: May 7, 1991
- Recorded: 1956–1984
- Genres: Funk; soul; R&B
- Length: 292:12
- Label: Polydor
- Producer: Various

James Brown chronology
I'm Real (1988)	Star Time (1991)	Love Over-Due (1991)

Professional ratings
Review scores
Source	Rating
AllMusic	5/5 stars
Robert Christgau	A+
Entertainment Weekly	A
Mojo	5/5 stars
Q	5/5 stars
Rolling Stone	5/5 stars
Uncut	2.5/5 stars
Encyclopedia of Popular Music	5/5 stars

Star Time is a four-CD box set by American musician James Brown. Released in May 1991 by Polydor Records, its contents span most of the length of his career up to the time of its release, starting in 1956 with his first hit record, "Please, Please, Please", and ending with "Unity", his 1984 collaboration with Afrika Bambaataa. Writing in 2007, Robert Christgau described it as "the finest box set ever released... as essential a package as the biz has ever hawked, not just because it's James Brown, but because compilers Cliff White and Harry Weinger invested so much care and knowledge in it." Its title comes from the question Brown's announcer would ask concert audiences, as heard on the 1963 album Live at the Apollo: "Are you ready for star time?" Star Time's liner notes, written by Cliff White, Harry Weinger, Nelson George, Alan Leeds, and Brown himself, won a 1991 Grammy Award for Best Album Notes. The notes also include a discography and a one-page comic by Mary Fleener, a visual interpretation of the 1964 song "I Got You (I Feel Good)".

Two single disc sampler compilations were released to promote it: 20 All-Time Greatest Hits! was released in North America, while Sex Machine: The Very Best of James Brown was released in the UK and Europe, with the latter including Brown's most recent hit not included on the box set, "Living In America" (1985).

In 2003, the album was ranked number 79 on Rolling Stone magazine's list of the 500 greatest albums of all time. It was the second-highest ranking box set on the list. In 2012, it moved up to 75, while in its 2020 revision, it moved to number 54.

== Track listing ==
Adapted from CD booklet's liner notes.

Disc 1 ("Mr. Dynamite")
No.	Title	Writer(s)	Source	Length
1.	"Please Please Please"	James Brown, Johnny Terry	Debut single, A-side, mono, March 1956	2:43
2.	"Why Do You Do Me"	Bobby Byrd, Sylvester Keels	Debut single, B-side, mono, March 1956	2:59
3.	"Try Me"	Brown	Single, A-side, mono, October 1958	2:30
4.	"Tell Me What I Did Wrong"	Brown	B-side of "Try Me", mono, October 1958	2:20
5.	"Bewildered"	Leonard Whitcup, Teddy Powell	Think! (1960)	2:21
6.	"Good Good Lovin'"	Brown, Albert Shubert	Single, A-side, stereo, July 1959	2:18
7.	"I'll Go Crazy"	Brown	Single, A-side, stereo, January 1960	2:05
8.	"I Know It's True"	Brown	B-side of "I'll Go Crazy", stereo, January 1960	2:40
9.	"(Do the) Mashed Potatoes, Pt. 1"	Dessie Rozier	Single, A-side, mono, February 1960	1:39
10.	"Think"	Lowman Pawling	Single, A-side, mono, May 1960	2:46
11.	"Baby, You're Right"	Brown, Joe Tex	Previously unreleased alternate take, September 1960	2:58
12.	"Lost Someone"	Brown, Byrd, Lloyd Eugene Stallworth	Single, A-side, stereo, November 1961	3:28
13.	"Night Train"	Oscar Washington, Lewis Simpkins, Jimmy Forrest	James Brown Presents His Band, October 1960 (but according to Wikipedia this song was recorded 2-9-1961 and according to Discogs it was first issued on the album "Twist Around", which was released in 1961.)	3:38
14.	"I've Got Money"	Brown	Single, A-side, mono, November 1962	2:29
15.	"I Don't Mind (live)"	Brown	Live at the Apollo (1963)	2:29
16.	"Prisoner of Love"	Leo Robin, Russ Columbo, Clarence Gaskill	Single, A-side, stereo, April 1963	2:24
17.	"Devil's Den"	Ted Wright	Two-part single, mono, April 1963	4:48
18.	"Out of the Blue"	Wright, Terry	Previously unreleased alternate take, March 1964	2:15
19.	"Out of Sight"	Wright	Single, A-side, mono, July 1964	2:19
20.	"Grits"	Nat Jones, Wright	Grits & Soul (1964)	3:58
21.	"Maybe the Last Time"	Wright	B-side of "Out of Sight", stereo July 1964	3:02
22.	"It's a Man's World"	Brown, Betty Newsome	Previously unreleased stereo mix, June 1964	3:22
23.	"I Got You"	Wright	Withdrawn single version, September 1964	2:27
24.	"Papa's Got a Brand New Bag, Pts. 1, 2 & 3"	Brown	Previously unreleased original complete take, February 1965	6:56
Total length:				70:54

Disc 2 ("The Hardest Working Man In Show Business")
No.	Title	Writer(s)	Source	Length
1.	"Papa's Got a Brand New Bag, Pt. 1"	Brown	Single, A-side, mono, July 1965	2:06
2.	"I Got You (I Feel Good)"	Brown	Single, A-side, mono, November 1965	2:45
3.	"Ain't That a Groove"	Brown, Jones	Previously unreleased unedited version	3:31
4.	"It's a Man's Man's Man's World"	Brown, Newsome	Single, A-side, mono, April 1966	2:46
5.	"Money Won't Change You"	Brown, Jones	Previously unreleased complete version	6:01
6.	"Don't Be a Dropout"	Brown, Jones	Previously unreleased unedited version	4:31
7.	"Bring It Up (Hipster's Avenue)"	Brown, Jones	Previously unreleased unedited version	3:48
8.	"Let Yourself Go"	Brown, Bud Hobgood	Previously unreleased unedited version	3:53
9.	"Cold Sweat"	Brown, Alfred Ellis	Cold Sweat (1967)	7:30
10.	"Get It Together"	Brown, Hobgood, Ellis	Two-part single, mono, October 1967	8:57
11.	"I Can't Stand Myself (When You Touch Me), Pt. 1"	Brown	Single, A-side, stereo, December 1967 (Note: The single version was released at a slower speed. The version on Star Time is at its original recorded tempo.)	3:29
12.	"I Got the Feelin'"	Brown	Single, A-side, stereo, April 1968	2:39
13.	"Licking Stick – Licking Stick"	Brown, Byrd, Ellis	Two-part single, stereo, May 1968	4:52
14.	"Say It Loud – I'm Black and I'm Proud, Pt. 1"	Brown, Ellis	Single, A-side, stereo, August 1968	2:59
15.	"There Was a Time (live)"	Brown, Hobgood	Previously unreleased (Note: The full performance would eventually be released as Say It Live and Loud: Live in Dallas 08.26.68.)	4:59
16.	"Give It Up or Turnit a Loose"	Charles Bobbitt	Single, A-side, stereo, January 1969	3:10
17.	"I Don't Want Nobody to Give Me Nothing (Open up the Door I'll Get It Myself)"	Brown	Two-part single, stereo, March 1969	5:59
Total length:				74:34

Disc 3 ("Soul Brother No. 1")
No.	Title	Writer(s)	Source	Length
1.	"Mother Popcorn"	Brown, Ellis	Two-part single, stereo, June 1969	6:18
2.	"Funky Drummer"	Brown	Two-part single, stereo, March 1970	7:00
3.	"Get Up (I Feel Like Being a) Sex Machine"	Brown, Byrd, Ron Lenhoff	Two-part single, stereo, July 1970	5:15
4.	"Super Bad, Pts. 1 & 2"	Brown	Previously unreleased stereo mix (Note: Released as a single A-side in mono in October 1970.)	4:26
5.	"Talkin' Loud & Sayin' Nothing"	Brown, Byrd	Previously unreleased original extended version (Note: Released as an edited two-part single in stereo in February 1972.)	8:59
6.	"Get Up, Get into It and Get Involved"	Brown	Previously unreleased stereo mix (Note: Released as a two-part single in mono in December 1970. Released with a cold ending on Foundations of Funk - A Brand New Bag: 1964-1969)	7:03
7.	"Soul Power, Pts. 1 & 2"	Brown	Previously unreleased unedited stereo version (Note: Released as an edited three-part single in mono in March 1971.)	4:25
8.	"Brother Rapp/Ain't It Funky Now (live)"	Brown	Previously unreleased live performance (Note: Initially, this was meant to appear on Love, Power, Peace, which was shelved until 1992.)	7:44
9.	"Hot Pants, Pt. 1"	Brown, Fred Wesley	Single, A-side, mono, July 1971	3:06
10.	"I'm a Greedy Man, Pt. 1"	Brown, Bobbit	Single, A-side, stereo, November 1971	3:36
11.	"Make It Funky, Pt. 1"	Brown, Bobbit	Single, A-side, mono	3:34
12.	"It's a New Day (live)"	Brown	Revolution of the Mind: Live at the Apollo, Volume III (1971)	3:48
13.	"I Got Ants in My Pants, Pt. 1"	Brown	Single, A-side, stereo, November 1972	3:01
14.	"King Heroin"	Brown, Bobbit, Dave Matthews, Manny Rosen	Single, A-side, stereo, February 1972	3:57
Total length:				72:54

Disc 4 ("The Godfather Of Soul")
No.	Title	Writer(s)	Source	Length
1.	"There It Is, Pt. 1"	Brown	Single, A-side, stereo, February 1972	3:20
2.	"Public Enemy #1, Pt. 1"	Brown, Bobbit, Henry Stallings	There It Is (1972)	5:09
3.	"Get on the Good Foot"	Brown, Wesley, Joseph Mims	Single, A-side, mono, July 1972	4:07
4.	"I Got a Bag of My Own"	Brown	Single, A-side, stereo, November 1972	3:44
5.	"Doing It to Death"	Brown	Single, A-side, mono, April 1973 (Note: Released under the name "Fred Wesley & The J.B.'s".)	5:14
6.	"The Payback"	Brown, Wesley, John Starks	The Payback (1973)	7:28
7.	"Papa Don't Take No Mess, Pt. 1"	Brown, Wesley, Starks, Bobbit	Hell (1974)	4:22
8.	"Stoned to the Bone, Pt. 1"	Brown	Single, A-side, mono, November 1973	3:28
9.	"My Thang"	Brown	Previously unreleased mix (Note: Released as a single A-side in stereo with percussion overdubs in April 1974.)	4:37
10.	"Funky President (People It's Bad)"	Brown	Single, A-side, stereo, October 1974	4:01
11.	"Hot (I Need to Be Loved, Loved, Loved)"	Brown	Single, A-side, stereo, December 1975	5:03
12.	"Get Up Offa That Thing (Release the Pressure)"	Diedre Jenkins, Deanna Brown, Yamma Brown	New edit created for Star Time (Note: Original mix released as a two-part single in stereo in May 1976.)	6:14
13.	"Body Heat, Pt. 1"	Jenkins, D. Brown, Y. Brown	Single, A-side, stereo, December 1976	4:29
14.	"It's Too Funky in Here"	George Jackson, Walter Shaw, Brad Shapiro, Robert Miller	The Original Disco Man (1979)	5:39
15.	"Rapp Payback (Where Iz Moses)"	J. Brown, Susaye Brown, Henry Stallings	Single, A-side, stereo, October 1980	4:36
16.	"Unity, Pt. 1"	Brown, Khayan Aasim Bambaataa, Douglas Wimbish, Bernard Alexander, Keith LeBlanc, Robin Halpin	Single, A-side, stereo, July 1984	3:40
Total length:				75:35

== Charts ==
Chart (1991)	Peak position
Australian Albums (ARIA)	146

== Certifications ==
Region	Certification	Certified units/sales
United States (RIAA)	Gold	125,000^{^}
^{^} Shipments figures based on certification alone.
