= Solid Gold: 30 Golden Hits =

Greatest hits album by James Brown
- Released: 1977
- Genre: R&B
- Length: 1:34:08
- Label: Polydor Records

Professional ratings
Review scores
Source	Rating
Allmusic	4.5/5 stars
Rolling Stone	5/5 stars

Solid Gold: 30 Golden Hits, also called 30 Golden Hits/21 Golden Years, is a greatest hits compilation album by James Brown. The double album set was initially released in 1977 on Polydor, and was re-released by the label in 1986. The album's liner notes listed the release dates and U.S. chart positions for each song and included an essay by Cliff White. This is the first compilation album to include Get Up (I Feel Like Being a) Sex Machine. According to AllMusic reviewer William Ruhlman, the collection was "state-of-the-art", an influential model "not only...for the many Brown compilations that would follow in later years, but also for the compilation boom in general". In 1981, Village Voice critic Robert Christgau described it as "an essential collection." Allmusic indicates that it supplies "the essence of James Brown", but also states "[i]t has since been superseded by the 1991 four-disc Star Time boxed set".

All songs are represented in their single edit form.

== Track listing ==
Side A

1. "Please, Please, Please" [Mono] (James Brown, Johnny Terry)
  - #5 Black Singles (1956) / #95 Black Singles (1964) / #95 Pop Singles(1964)
2. "Try Me" [Mono] (Brown)
  - #1 Black Singles (1959) / #48 Pop Singles (1959) / #34 Black Singles (1965) / #63 Pop Singles (1965)
3. "Good Good Lovin'" [Mono] (Brown, Albert Shubert)
4. "I'll Go Crazy" (Brown)
  - #15 Black Singles (1960) / #38 Black Singles (1966) / #73 Pop Singles (1966)
5. "Think" [Mono] (Lowman Pauling)
  - #7 Black Singles (1960) / #33 Pop Singles (1960) / #100 Pop Singles (1967) / #15 Black Singles (1973) / #77 Pop Singles (1973)
6. "Night Train" [Mono] (Jimmy Forrest, Lewis Simpkins, Oscar Washington)
  - #5 Black Singles (1962) / #35 Pop Singles (1962)
7. "Out of Sight" [Mono] (Ted Wright)
  - #24 Black Singles (1964) / #24 Pop Singles (1964)
8. "Papa's Got a Brand New Bag" [Mono] (Brown)
  - #1 Black Singles (1965) / #8 Pop Singles (1965) / #25 UK Singles (1965)
9. "I Got You (I Feel Good)" [Mono] (Brown)
  - #1 Black Singles (1965) / #3 Pop Singles (1965) / #29 UK Singles (1966)

Side B

1. "It's a Man's Man's Man's World" [Mono] (Brown, Betty Jean Newsome)
  - #1 Black Singles (1966) / #8 Pop Singles (1966) / #13 UK Singles (1966)
2. "Cold Sweat" (Brown, Pee Wee Ellis)
  - #1 Black Singles (1967) / #7 Pop Singles (1967)
3. "There Was a Time" (Brown, Bud Hobgood)
  - #3 Black Singles (1968) / #36 Pop Singles (1968)
4. "I Got the Feelin' (Brown)
  - #1 Black Singles (1968) / #6 Pop Singles (1968)
5. "Say It Loud (I'm Black and I'm Proud)" (Brown, Ellis)
  - #1 Black Singles (1968) / #10 Pop Singles (1968)
6. "Give It Up or Turnit a Loose" (Charles Bobbit)
  - #1 Black Singles (1969) / #15 Pop Singles (1969)
7. "Mother Popcorn" [Duophonic] (Brown, Ellis)
  - #1 Black Singles (1969) / #11 Pop Singles (1969)
8. "Get Up (I Feel Like Being a) Sex Machine" (Brown, Bobby Byrd, Ron Lenhoff)
  - #2 Black Singles (1970) / #15 Pop Singles (1970) / #61 Pop Singles (1975) / #32 UK Singles (1970)

Side C

1. "Super Bad" (Brown)
  - #1 Black Singles (1970) / #13 Pop Singles (1970)
2. "Soul Power" [Mono] (Brown)
  - #3 Black Singles (1971) / #29 Pop Singles (1971)
3. "Hot Pants" (Brown, Fred Wesley)
  - #1 Black Singles (1971) / #15 Pop Singles (1971)
4. "Make It Funky" (Bobbit, Brown)
  - #1 Black Singles (1971) / #22 Pop Singles (1971)
5. "Talking Loud and Saying Nothing" [Mono] (Brown, Byrd)
  - #1 Black Singles (1972) / #27 Pop Singles (1972)
6. "Honky Tonk" (Billy Butler, Bill Doggett, Clifford Scott, Berisford "Shep" Shepherd)
  - #7 Black Singles (1972) / #44 Pop Singles (1972)
7. "Get on the Good Foot" (Brown, Joe Mims, Wesley)
  - #1 Black Singles (1972) / #18 Pop Singles (1972)

Side D

1. "The Payback" (Brown, Wesley, Starks)
  - #1 Black Singles (1974) / #26 Pop Singles (1974)
2. "My Thang" (Brown)
  - #1 Black Singles (1974) / #29 Pop Singles (1974)
3. "Papa Don't Take No Mess" (Bobbit, Brown, Starks, Wesley)
  - #1 Black Singles (1974) / #331 Pop Singles (1974)
4. "Funky President (People It's Bad)" [Mono] (Brown)
  - #4 Black Singles (1975) / #44 Pop Singles (1975)
5. "Hot (I Need To Be Loved, Loved, Loved, Loved)" (Brown)
  - #31 Black Singles (1976)
6. "Get Up Offa That Thing" (Brown)
  - #4 Black Singles (1976) / #45 Pop Singles / #22 UK Singles (1976)
