= Live at the Apollo, Volume II =

- Cover of the 2001 Deluxe Edition

Live album by James Brown and the Famous Flames
- Released: August 1968
- Recorded: June 24–25, 1967
- Venue: Apollo Theater (New York City, New York)
- Genre: Soul; Funk
- Label: King (original LP); 1022; Polydor (Deluxe Edition); 549 884-2
- Producer: James Brown

James Brown live albums chronology
Live at the Garden (1967)	Live at the Apollo, Volume II (1968)	Sex Machine (1970)

Singles from Live at the Apollo, Volume II
- 1. "Think" Released: February 2, 1967; 2. "Kansas City" Released: February 4, 1967; 3. "There Was a Time" Released: November 1967

Professional ratings
Review scores
Source	Rating
AllMusic	4/5 stars

Live at the Apollo, Volume II is a 1968 live double album by James Brown and The Famous Flames, recorded in 1967 at the Apollo Theater in Harlem. It is a follow-up to Brown's 1963 recording, Live at the Apollo. It is best known for the long medley of "Let Yourself Go", "There Was a Time", and "I Feel All Right", followed by "Cold Sweat", which document the emergence of Brown's funk style. It peaked at No. 32 on the Billboard Top LP's chart. Robert Christgau included the album in his "basic record library" for the 1950s and 1960s.

On the original 1968 album and its 1987 CD reissue the performances were edited to accommodate the recording medium. A more complete recording of what was captured from the performances was remastered and released on a 2-CD Deluxe Edition in 2001. The Famous Flames, (Bobby Byrd and Bobby Bennett), were credited on the record label and the back cover of the album (although not on the front). But on the original album release, their group name was cut from the live intro, because in between the time of the recording of the album and its actual 1968 release, the group members quit James Brown due to salary disputes, essentially leaving Brown as a solo act. (Famous Flame Lloyd Stallworth had left the group during 1966 for the same reasons). However, years later, on the 2001 Deluxe Edition CD release, the complete introduction by MC Frankie Crocker, including The Famous Flames' name, was restored.

This was the last live album recorded by James Brown & The Famous Flames as a group.

== Track list ==
Times are listed from their respected CD issues; the original 1967 issue of the album is un-indexed.

=== Original 1968 issue ===
Side 1

1. Introduction – 0:32
2. "Think" – 2:54
3. "I Wanna Be Around" – 3:09
4. James Brown Thanks – 1:11
5. "That's Life" – 4:05
6. "Kansas City" – 4:49

Side 2

1. Medley – 14:54:
  - "Let Yourself Go"
  - "There Was a Time"
  - "I Feel All Right"
2. "Cold Sweat" – 4:43

Side 3

1. "Maybe the Last Time" – 3:06
2. "I Got You (I Feel Good)" – 0:38
3. "Prisoner of Love" – 7:25
4. "Out of Sight" – 0:26
5. "Try Me" – 2:54
6. "Bring It Up (Hipster's Avenue)" – 4:38 (includes intro of Famous Flames Bobby Byrd & Bobby Bennett)

Side 4

1. "It's a Man's Man's Man's World" – 11:16
2. "Lost Someone (Medley)" – 6:21
3. "Please, Please, Please" – 2:44

==== Notes on 1987 CD issue ====
- The medley on Side B was tracked as three different songs:
1. "Let Yourself Go" – 4:01
2. "There Was a Time" – 4:18
3. "I Feel All Right" – 5:32
- "It's a Man's Man's Man's World" was edited to 7:10, while "Lost Someone (Medley)" was edited to 10:17.

=== 2001 Deluxe Edition ===
Disc one
No.	Title	Length
1.	"Introduction to the James Brown Show" (MC Frankie Crocker)	0:32
2.	"Think" (Duet with Marva Whitney)	2:55
3.	"I Wanna Be Around"	3:11
4.	"James Brown (Thanks)"	1:51
5.	"That's Life"	4:40
6.	"Kansas City"	3:53
7.	"Sweet Soul Music" (Bobby Byrd)	2:38
8.	"It's a Man's Man's Man's World"	19:05
9.	"Caravan" (The James Brown Band featuring the J.B. Dancers)	3:26

Disc two
No.	Title	Length
1.	"Introduction to 'Star Time'" (MC Frankie Crocker and Sad Sam)	0:34
2.	"Money Won't Change You/Out of Sight"	0:42
3.	"Bring It Up"	4:40
4.	"Try Me"	3:11
5.	"Let Yourself Go"	1:42
6.	"There Was a Time"	8:52
7.	"I Feel All Right"	6:52
8.	"Cold Sweat"	6:02
9.	"Prisoner of Love"	8:17
10.	"My Girl" (instrumental interlude)	0:23
11.	"Maybe the Last Time"	4:36
12.	"I Got You (I Feel Good)"	0:28
13.	"Please, Please, Please"	3:02
14.	"Bring It Up (Finale)"	1:10

== Personnel ==
- James Brown – lead vocals
- Bobby Byrd – backing vocals
- Bobby Bennett – backing vocals
- Waymon Reed – trumpet
- Joe Dupars – trumpet
- Levi Rasbury – valve trombone, emcee
- Pee Wee Ellis – alto saxophone, organ, music director
- Maceo Parker – tenor saxophone
- Eldee Williams – tenor saxophone
- St. Clair Pinckney – tenor and baritone saxophone
- Richard Jones, Marilyn Jones, Vivian Robinson – violin
- Jimmy Nolen – guitar
- Alfonzo Kellum – guitar, bass
- Bernard Odum – bass
- Ron Selico – bongos, drums
- Jabo Starks – drums
- Clyde Stubblefield – drums

== Charts ==
Chart (1968)	Peak position
US Billboard Top LPs	32
