= James Brown Sings Raw Soul =

Studio album by James Brown
- Released: March 1967
- Recorded: March 23, 1964 – January 15, 1967
- Studio: Bell Sound Studios (New York City, New York); Fort Homer W. Hesterly Armory (Tampa, Florida); Talent Masters Studios (New York City, New York); Arthur Smith Studios (Charlotte, North Carolina); RCA Studios (New York City, New York); King Studios (Cincinnati, Ohio); Latin Casino (Cherry Hill, New Jersey)
- Genre: Soul
- Length: 34:18
- Label: King; 1016
- Producer: James Brown

James Brown chronology
James Brown Sings Christmas Songs (1966)	James Brown Sings Raw Soul (1967)	James Brown Plays the Real Thing (1967)

Singles from James Brown Sings Raw Soul
- 1. "Don't Be a Drop-Out" Released: September 1966; 2. "Bring It Up" Released: December 1966; 3. "Let Yourself Go" Released: April 1967

Professional ratings
Review scores
Source	Rating
AllMusic	3/5 stars
The Rolling Stone Album Guide	4/5 stars

James Brown Sings Raw Soul is the fifteenth studio album by American musician James Brown. The album was released in March 1967, by King Records.

== Chart performance ==
The album debuted on Billboard magazine's Top LP's chart in the issue dated April 8, 1967, peaking at No. 88 during a fourteen-week run on the chart.

== Track listing ==
No.	Title	Writer(s)	Length
1.	"Bring It Up"	James Brown	2:45
2.	"Don't Be a Dropout"	James Brown, Nat Jones	3:40
3.	"Till Then"	Eddie Seiler, Guy Wood, Sol Marcus	2:39
4.	"Tell Me That You Love Me"	James Brown, Bud Hobgood	1:40
5.	"Yours and Mine"	James Brown, Bud Hobgood	3:08
6.	"Money Won't Change You, Pt. 1"	James Brown, Nat Jones	2:46
7.	"Money Won't Change You, Pt. 2"	James Brown, Nat Jones	2:24
8.	"Only You"	Ande Rand, Buck Ram	2:47
9.	"Let Yourself Go"	James Brown	2:55
10.	"The Nearness of You"	Hoagy Carmichael, Ned Washington	3:06
11.	"Nobody Knows"	James Brown, James Crawford	3:19
12.	"Stone Fox"	James Brown, Bud Hobgood	2:46

== Charts ==
Chart (1963)	Peak position
US Billboard Top LPs	88
