= Cold sweat =

Cold sweat may refer to:

- Cold sweat or diaphoresis, excessive sweating commonly associated with shock and other medical emergency conditions

== Film and TV ==
- Cold Sweat (1970 film), a film starring Charles Bronson
- Cold Sweat (1993 film), a thriller film
- Cold Sweat, the 92nd episode of Code Lyoko

== Music ==
- "Cold Sweat", a 1967 song by James Brown
- Cold Sweat (album), the 1967 album by James Brown
- "Cold Sweat" (Thin Lizzy song), a 1983 song by Thin Lizzy
- "Coldsweat", a song from The Sugarcubes' debut album Life's Too Good
- "Cold Sweat", a song from Tinashe's 2014 album Aquarius
- "Cold Sweat", a song from Megadeth's 2013 album Super Collider
