= I Got You (I Feel Good) (album) =

Compilation album by James Brown
- Released: January 1966
- Recorded: February 20, 1960 – July 26, 1965
- Studio: United Studios (Los Angeles, California); King Studios (Cincinnati, Ohio); Criteria Studios (Miami, Florida); Rodel Studios (Washington, D.C.)
- Genre: Rhythm and blues; Soul
- Length: 31:26
- Label: King

James Brown chronology
James Brown Plays James Brown Today & Yesterday (1965)	I Got You (I Feel Good) (1966)	Mighty Instrumentals (1966)

Singles from I Got You (I Feel Good)
- 1. "I Got You (I Feel Good)" Released: October 1965

Professional ratings
Review scores
Source	Rating
AllMusic	3.5/5 stars

"I Got You (I Feel Good)"
James Brown's "I Got You (I Feel Good)" from this album

I Got You (I Feel Good) is a compilation album by American musician James Brown. It consists primarily of songs released on previous studio albums, as well as songs released on singles, such as "Night Train", "I Can't Help It (I Just Do-Do-Do)", and "Suds". The album was released in January of 1966. Brown's vocal group, The Famous Flames—Bobby Byrd, Bobby Bennett, and Lloyd Stallworth—can be heard on the previously released songs "Think", "Good Good Lovin'" and "Dancin' Little Thing"; Byrd and Stallworth co-wrote but did not sing on the previously released "Lost Someone".

== Track listing ==
All tracks composed by James Brown; except where indicated

No.	Title	Writer(s)	Length
1.	"I Got You (I Feel Good)"		2:45
2.	"Lost Someone"	Baby Lloyd Stallworth, Bobby Byrd, James Brown	3:30
3.	"Night Train"	Jimmy Forrest, Lewis Simpkins, Oscar Washington	3:42
4.	"You've Got the Power"	Johnny Terry, James Brown	2:13
5.	"Love Don't Love Nobody"	Roy Brown	2:04
6.	"Think"	Lowman Pauling	2:47
7.	"Good Good Lovin'"	Albert Shubert, James Brown	2:17
8.	"I Can't Help It (I Just Do-Do-Do)"		2:31
9.	"I've Got Money"		2:30
10.	"Three Hearts In A Tangle"	Ray Pennington, Sonny Thompson	2:44
11.	"Suds" (instrumental)	Nat Kendrick	2:19
12.	"Dancin Little Thing"	Hank Ballard	2:04

== Chart positions ==
Chart (1966)	Peak position
US Billboard 200	36
US R&B Albums (Billboard)	2
