= Mighty Instrumentals =

Studio album by James Brown
- Released: 1966
- Recorded: October 4, 1960 – February 1965
- Studio: United Studios (Los Angeles, California); King Studios (Cincinnati, Ohio); Dukoff Studios (Miami, Florida); Arthur Smith Studios (Charlotte, North Carolina)
- Genre: Funk
- Length: 29:51
- Label: King
- Producer: James Brown

James Brown chronology
I Got You (I Feel Good) (1966)	Mighty Instrumentals (1966)	James Brown Plays New Breed (The Boo-Ga-Loo) (1966)

Professional ratings
Review scores
Source	Rating
AllMusic	3/5 stars
The Rolling Stone Album Guide	3/5 stars

Mighty Instrumentals is the eleventh studio album by American musician James Brown. It consists of instrumentals recorded during his time with the King label. Every song had previously been released other than "James Brown House Party", an alternate recording of Mashed Potatoes U.S.A.. The album was released in 1966.

== Track listing ==
All tracks are written by James Brown; unless where indicated.

No.	Title	Writer(s)	Length
1.	"Papa's Got A Brand New Bag Part 2"		1:45
2.	"(Can You) Feel It"		2:56
3.	"Hold It"	Clifford Scott, Billy Butler	1:54
4.	"Sticky"	James Brown, J.C. Davis	2:50
5.	"The Scratch"	James Alston	1:46
6.	"James Brown House Party"		2:13
7.	"Night Train"	Oscar Washington, Lewis Simpkins, Jimmy Forrest	2:21
8.	"Every Beat Of My Heart"	Johnny Otis	3:39
9.	"Cross Firing"		2:28
10.	"Suds"	Nat Kendrick	2:21
11.	"Doin' the Limbo"		2:35
12.	"Choo Choo"		2:53
