= Soul Session Live =

Live album by James Brown & Friends
- Released: 1989
- Recorded: December 1988 ("Gimme Your Love"); January 9–10, 1987 (remainder of titles)
- Venue: Club Taboo, Detroit, MI
- Genre: Soul, pop
- Length: 42:54
- Label: Scotti Bros.
- Producer: Johnny Musso; Narada Michael Walden ("Gimme Your Love" only)

James Brown live albums chronology
| Live at Chastain Park (1988) | Soul Session Live (1989) | Love Power Peace: Live at the Olympia, Paris, 1971 (1992) |

Singles from Soul Session Live
- 1. "Gimme Your Love" Released: September 1989

Soul Session Live is a 1989 live album by James Brown. Credited on the album cover to "James Brown & Friends", it features guest performances from Joe Cocker, Wilson Pickett, Billy Vera, and Robert Palmer. It also includes one studio track, "Gimme Your Love", a duet between Brown and Aretha Franklin, which was their first and only recording together. It was released in connection with an HBO/Cinemax concert film, Soul Session.

Two of the album's tracks were nominated for Grammy Awards at the 1990 ceremony: "Gimme Your Love", for Best R&B Performance by a Duo or Group with Vocal, and Cocker's solo rendition of "When a Man Loves a Woman", for Best R&B Song.

== Track listing ==
| No. | Title | Writer(s) | Performer(s) | Length |
|---|---|---|---|---|
| 1. | "Show Introduction" | | James Brown | 0:28 |
| 2. | "Papa's Got a Brand New Bag" | Brown | Brown | 3:15 |
| 3. | "How Do You Stop" | Dan Hartman, Charlie Midnight | Brown | 5:22 |
| 4. | "Cold Sweat" | Brown, Pee Wee Ellis | Brown, Wilson Pickett | 4:08 |
| 5. | "Out of Sight" | Brown | Billy Vera | 2:34 |
| 6. | "When a Man Loves a Woman" | Calvin Lewis, Andrew Wright | Joe Cocker | 5:46 |
| 7. | "Gimme Your Love" | Narada Michael Walden, Jeffrey Cohen | Brown, Aretha Franklin | 5:16 |
| 8. | "I'll Go Crazy" | Brown | Brown, Joe Cocker | 3:16 |
| 9. | "I Got You (I Feel Good)" | Brown | Brown, Robert Palmer | 3:25 |
| 10. | "Try Me" | Brown | Brown, Robert Palmer | 5:18 |
| 11. | "Living in America" | Dan Hartman, Charlie Midnight | Brown & Friends | 4:06 |
