= It Isn't, It Wasn't, It Ain't Never Gonna Be =

Single by Aretha Franklin and Whitney Houston

from the album Through the Storm
- B-side: "If Ever a Love There Was"
- Released: June 10, 1989
- Genre: New jack swing
- Length: 5:37; 4:49 (single edit)
- Label: Arista
- Songwriters: Albert Hammond; Diane Warren
- Producers: Narada Michael Walden (album version); Gene Griffin, Teddy Riley (remix version)

Aretha Franklin singles chronology
"Through the Storm" (1989)	"It Isn't, It Wasn't, It Ain't Never Gonna Be" (1989)	"Gimme Your Love" (1989)

Whitney Houston singles chronology
"I Know Him So Well" (1988)	"It Isn't, It Wasn't, It Ain't Ever Gonna Be" (1989)	"I'm Your Baby Tonight" (1990)

Music video
- "It Isn't, It Wasn't, It Ain't Never Gonna Be " on YouTube

"It Isn't, It Wasn't, It Ain't Never Gonna Be" is a duet recorded between Aretha Franklin and Whitney Houston, and appeared on Franklin's 1989 album Through the Storm. The song was released on June 10, 1989, as the second single from the album by Arista Records.

The original album version was written by Albert Hammond and Diane Warren and produced by Narada Michael Walden, and the re-mixed version was produced by Teddy Riley. In the US, the single reached No. 41 on the Billboard Hot 100 and No. 5 on the R&B Singles chart. On the UK Singles Chart, it peaked at No. 29.

== Critical reception ==
AllMusic editor William Ruhlmann retrospectively panned "It Isn't, It Wasn't, It Ain't Never Gonna Be", calling it "an embarrassing failure for both Franklin and the previously pop-perfect Whitney Houston."

=== Track listings and formats ===
- UK, CD maxi single
1. "It Isn't, It Wasn't, It Ain't Never Gonna Be" (Single Remix) – 4:02
2. "It Isn't, It Wasn't, It Ain't Never Gonna Be" (Extended Mix) – 6:12
3. "It Isn't, It Wasn't, It Ain't Never Gonna Be" (Hip Hop Remix) – 4:57
4. "Think" (1989) – 3:39
- US, 12" Vinyl single

A1: "It Isn't, It Wasn't, It Ain't Never Gonna Be" (Extended Radio Mix) – 6:12
A2: "It Isn't, It Wasn't, It Ain't Never Gonna Be" (House Radio Mix) – 5:05
B1: "It Isn't, It Wasn't, It Ain't Never Gonna Be" (Hip Hop Radio Mix) – 4:57
B2: "It Isn't, It Wasn't, It Ain't Never Gonna Be" (New Jack Swing Dub Mix) – 6:20
B3: "Think" (1989) – 3:36

- Japan, CD mini single
1. "It Isn't, It Wasn't, It Ain't Never Gonna Be" (Single Edit) – 4:49
2. "If Ever a Love There Was" – 4:47
- US, 12" Vinyl promo

A1: "It Isn't, It Wasn't, It Ain't Never Gonna Be" (Extended Radio Mix) – 6:12
A2: "It Isn't, It Wasn't, It Ain't Never Gonna Be" (Dub Mix) – 5:05
B1: "It Isn't, It Wasn't, It Ain't Never Gonna Be" (After Hours Club Mix) – 7:35
B2: "It Isn't, It Wasn't, It Ain't Never Gonna Be" (1989 Vogue Dub Mix) – 5:36

- German, CD maxi single
1. "It Isn't, It Wasn't, It Ain't Never Gonna Be" (Extended Radio Mix) – 6:12
2. "It Isn't, It Wasn't, It Ain't Never Gonna Be" (Single Edit) – 4:49
3. "It Isn't, It Wasn't, It Ain't Never Gonna Be" (Hip Hop Mix) – 4:57
4. "Think" (1989) – 3:39

== Personnel ==
- Aretha Franklin – lead vocals, vocal engineer
- Whitney Houston – lead vocals
- Walter "Baby Love" Afanasieff – co-producer, keyboards, synth bass, drum programming
- Narada Michael Walden – producer, arrangements
- Ren Klyce – Fairlight CMI programming
- Karen "Kitty Beethoven" Brewington, Melisa Kary – backing vocals
- Lincoln Clapp – engineer
- David Frazer – engineer, mixing engineer
- Dana Jon Chappelle – additional engineer

== Charts ==
=== Weekly charts ===
Chart (1989)	Peak position
Canada Top Singles (RPM)	43
European Hot 100 Singles (Music & Media)	95
Ireland (IRMA)	14
Italy Airplay (Music & Media)	4
Netherlands (Dutch Top 40 Tipparade)	6
Netherlands (Single Top 100)	40
UK Singles (Official Charts)	29
US Billboard Hot 100	41
US Hot R&B/Hip-Hop Songs (Billboard)	5
US Dance Club Songs (Billboard)	18

=== Year-end charts ===
Chart (1989)	Position
US Top Black Singles (Billboard)	84
