= Live at the Garden (James Brown album) =

1967 live album by James Brown and The Famous Flames

Live album by James Brown and The Famous Flames
- Released: May 1967 (original LP); October 26, 2009 (Expanded Edition)
- Recorded: January 14, 1967 (original LP); January 14–15, 1967 (Expanded Edition)
- Venue: Latin Casino (Cherry Hill, New Jersey)
- Genre: Soul; Funk
- Length: 2:15:20 (Expanded Edition)
- Label: King (original LP); 1018; Hip-O Select (Expanded Edition); B0012928-02
- Producer: James Brown

James Brown live albums chronology
The James Brown Show (1967)	Live at the Garden (1967)	Live at the Apollo, Volume II (1968)

Singles from Live at the Garden
- 1. "Let Yourself Go" Released: April 1967

Live at the Garden is a 1967 live album by James Brown and The Famous Flames. It was recorded on January 14, 1967 in the middle of a ten-day engagement at the Latin Casino in Cherry Hill, New Jersey - Brown's first at an upscale nightclub. Like most of Brown's live albums, overdubbed crowd noise was added to the original recording for its LP release. It included one new song, "Let Yourself Go", which was recorded after hours at the casino; it appeared on the album disguised as a live recording. Although Live at the Garden peaked at #41 on the Billboard album chart, it came to be overshadowed in Brown's catalog by his next live album, Live at the Apollo, Volume II, recorded later the same year and released in 1968.

In 2009 Hip-O Select released a 2-CD Expanded Edition of Live at the Garden. In addition to the contents of the original LP, it included additional, overdub-free live recordings from Brown's Latin Casino engagement, along with the "Let Yourself Go" recording session. Because Flames member Lloyd Stallworth had left the group during 1966, The Famous Flames lineup on this 1967 album consisted of Bobby Byrd, Bobby Bennett, and Brown himself. In 1968, after this live album was recorded,(and after the double album, Live at The Apollo, Volume 2), Byrd and Bennett would also leave, and The Famous Flames were officially disbanded, leaving Brown as a solo act.

== Track listing ==
=== Original LP ===
Side one
No.	Title	Writer(s)	Length
1.	"Out of Sight"	James Brown	1:14
2.	"Bring It Up"	James Brown	4:01
3.	"Try Me"	James Brown	2:19
4.	"Let Yourself Go"	James Brown	3:47
5.	"Hip Bag '67"	James Brown	5:41
6.	"Prisoner of Love"	Russ Columbo, Clarence Gaskill, Leo Robin	4:59

Side two
No.	Title	Writer(s)	Length
1.	"It May Be the Last Time"	James Brown	4:50
2.	"I Got You (I Feel Good)"	James Brown	2:27
3.	"Ain't That a Groove - Part 1"	James Brown, Nat Jones	6:03
4.	"Ain't That a Groove - Part 2"	James Brown, Nat Jones	1:10
5.	"Please, Please, Please"	James Brown, Johnny Terry	2:45
6.	"Bring It Up" (Finale)	James Brown	1:25

=== 2009 Expanded Edition ===
Disc one
No.	Title	Writer(s)	Length
1.	"Out of Sight"	James Brown	1:14
2.	"Bring It Up"	James Brown	4:01
3.	"Try Me"	James Brown	2:19
4.	"Let Yourself Go"	James Brown	3:47
5.	"Hip Bag '67"	James Brown	5:41
6.	"Prisoner of Love"	Russ Columbo, Clarence Gaskill, Leo Robin	4:59
7.	"It May Be the Last Time"	James Brown	4:50
8.	"I Got You (I Feel Good)"	James Brown	2:27
9.	"Ain't That a Groove - Part 1"	James Brown, Nat Jones	6:03
10.	"Ain't That a Groove - Part 2"	James Brown, Nat Jones	1:10
11.	"Please, Please, Please"	James Brown, Johnny Terry	2:45
12.	"Bring It Up" (Finale)	James Brown	1:25
13.	"Introduction - Vonsheliah"	James Brown, Nat Jones	0:35
14.	"The King"	James Brown	1:55
15.	"Wade in the Water"	Ramsey Lewis	5:42
16.	"Devil's Den"	James Brown	3:07
17.	"Medley: Headache/Get Loose/Jabo"	James Brown, Nat Jones	5:45
18.	"Night Train"	Jimmy Forrest, Oscar Washington	11:15

Disc two
No.	Title	Writer(s)	Length
1.	"Introduction/Out of Sight"	James Brown	1:18
2.	"Bring It Up"	James Brown	4:35
3.	"Try Me"	James Brown	2:37
4.	"Come Rain or Come Shine"	Harold Arlen, Johnny Mercer	3:02
5.	"Papa's Got a Brand New Bag"	James Brown	9:27
6.	"Prisoner of Love"	Russ Columbo, Clarence Gaskill, Leo Robin	5:15
7.	"Maybe the Last Time"	James Brown	4:44
8.	"I Got You (I Feel Good)"	James Brown	2:23
9.	"James Brown Thank You"		3:09
10.	"It's a Man's Man's Man's World"	James Brown, Betty Jean Newsome	7:16
11.	"Ain't That a Groove"	James Brown, Nat Jones	8:34
12.	"Please, Please, Please"	James Brown, Johnny Terry	2:46
13.	"Bring It Up" (Finale)	James Brown	1:39
14.	"Let Yourself Go" (Instrumental Jam)	James Brown	4:11
15.	"Let Yourself Go" (False Start)	James Brown	1:24
16.	"Let Yourself Go" (Extended released version)	James Brown	4:00

== Personnel ==
- James Brown – lead vocals, organ
- Bobby Byrd – backing vocals
- Bobby Bennett – backing vocals
- Levi Rasbury – valve trombone, emcee
- Waymon Reed – trumpet
- Joe Dupars – trumpet
- Pee Wee Ellis – tenor saxophone, organ, music director
- Eldee Williams – tenor saxophone
- St. Clair Pinckney – tenor and baritone saxophone
- Richard Jones and others unidentified – violin
- Jimmy Nolen – guitar
- Alfonzo Kellum – guitar, bass
- Bernard Odum – bass
- Ron Carter – acoustic bass ("Come Rain or Come Shine")
- Ron Selico – drums, bongos
- unidentified – drums ("Come Rain or Come Shine")
- Jabo Starks – drums
- Clyde Stubblefield – drums
