= Say It Live and Loud: Live in Dallas 08.26.68 =

Live album by James Brown
- Released: August 11, 1998
- Recorded: August 26, 1968
- Venue: Dallas Memorial Auditorium
- Genre: Soul, funk
- Length: 76:10
- Label: PolyGram
- Producer: James Brown; Harry Weinger; Alan Leeds

James Brown live albums chronology
Live at the Apollo 1995 (1995)	Say It Live and Loud: Live in Dallas 08.26.68 (1998)

Say It Live and Loud: Live in Dallas 08.26.68 is a live album by James Brown released in 1998. Taped at Dallas Memorial Auditorium soon after "Say It Loud – I'm Black and I'm Proud" had been released to the airwaves, it includes one of the only live recordings of the song, with the arena crowd shouting the call and response portions. Village Voice critic Robert Christgau deemed it the second best live recording from Brown's "crucial" 1967–71 period, behind 1970's Sex Machine. Following the 50th anniversary of the recording, the entire performance, including never before released live performances of "That's Life" and "The Popcorn", was released on vinyl by Republic Records on October 12, 2018.

== Track listing ==
1. Show Introduction – 0:37
2. "If I Ruled the World" (Leslie Bricusse, Cyril Ornadel) – 3:45
3. James Brown Thanks – 0:49
4. "Say It Loud (I'm Black and I'm Proud)" (Introduction) – 1:33
5. "Say It Loud (I'm Black and I'm Proud)" (James Brown, Pee Wee Ellis) – 3:08
6. "I Guess I'll Have to Cry, Cry, Cry" (James Brown) – 4:19
7. "Kansas City" (Jerry Leiber, Mike Stoller) – 4:13
8. "Suds" (Nat Kendrick) – 5:16
9. "Soul Pride" (James Brown, Pee Wee Ellis) – 3:01
10. "Tighten Up" (Archie Bell, Billy Buttier) – 7:11
11. Introduction to Star Time! – 0:42
12. "Licking Stick-Licking Stick" (James Brown, Bobby Byrd, Pee Wee Ellis) – 4:13
13. "Cold Sweat" (James Brown, Pee Wee Ellis) – 12:51
14. "There Was a Time" (James Brown, Bud Hobgood) – 4:57
15. Medley: "Try Me"/"Lost Someone"/"Bewildered" (James Brown, Bobby Byrd, Teddy Powell, Lloyd Stallworth, Leonard Whitcup) – 6:14
16. "Papa's Got a Brand New Bag" (James Brown) – 0:30
17. "I Got the Feelin'" (James Brown) – 2:43
18. "Maybe the Last Time" (James Brown) – 1:13
19. "I Got You (I Feel Good)" (James Brown) – 0:27
20. "Please, Please, Please" (James Brown, Johnny Terry) – 2:15
21. "I Can't Stand Myself (When You Touch Me)" (James Brown) – 3:09
22. "Cold Sweat" (Reprise) (James Brown, Pee Wee Ellis) – 0:46
23. "I Got the Feelin'" (Reprise) (James Brown) – 0:27
24. "Say It Loud (I'm Black and I'm Proud)" (Reprise) (James Brown, Pee Wee Ellis) – 1:51

== Personnel ==
- James Brown – vocals
- Richard "Kush" Griffith – trumpet
- Waymon Reed – trumpet
- Levi Rasbury – valve trombone
- Fred Wesley – trombone
- Maceo Parker – tenor sax, emcee
- Alfred "Pee Wee" Ellis – bandleader, alto saxophone, organ
- St. Clair Pinckney – tenor and baritone sax, duet voice on "Licking Stick-Licking Stick"
- Jimmy Nolen – guitar
- Alphonso "Country" Kellum – bass guitar
- Sweet Charles Sherrell – bass on "I Can't Stand Myself"
- Clyde Stubblefield – drums
- Nate Jones – drums
- Richard Jones – violin
- Marilyn Jones – violin
- Sylvia Medford – violin
