= Like a Baby =

1960 song by Elvis Presley

Song by Elvis Presley

from the album Elvis Is Back!
- Language: English
- Released: April 8, 1960
- Recorded: April 3, 1960, RCA Studio B, Nashville, Tennessee
- Genre: Blues
- Length: 2:38
- Songwriter: Jesse Stone
- Producers: Steve Sholes, Chet Atkins

"Like a Baby"

Single by James Brown and the Famous Flames

from the album James Brown and His Famous Flames Tour the U.S.A.
- B-side: "Every Beat of My Heart"
- Released: 1963
- Genre: Rhythm and blues
- Length: 2:50
- Label: King; 5710
- Songwriter: Jesse Stone

James Brown charting singles chronology
""I've Got Money" (B-side of "Three Hearts in a Tangle")" (1962)	"Like a Baby" (1963)	""Every Beat of My Heart" (B-side of "Like a Baby")" (1963)

Audio video
- "Like A Baby" on YouTube

"Like a Baby" is a song written by Jesse Stone. It was recorded by Vikki Nelson for a Vik Records single in 1957. Priscilla Bowman recorded it for Abner Records in 1959. It was also recorded by Elvis Presley for his 1960 album Elvis Is Back!. James Brown and the Famous Flames recorded the song and released it as a single in 1963, which charted No. 24 R&B. The single's B-side, an instrumental version of "Every Beat of My Heart", also charted, reaching No. 99 on the Billboard Hot 100. Brown and the Flames performed "Like a Baby" on their 1964 live album Pure Dynamite! Live at the Royal.

Wanda Jackson recorded "Like a Baby" for her 2011 album The Party Ain't Over.

Glenn Danzig recorded the song for his 2020 album Danzig Sings Elvis.

This is not the song "Like a Baby" recorded by Len Barry (1965) and written by John Madara, David White and Len Barry.

== Personnel (Elvis Presley version) ==
Sourced from Keith Flynn.

- Elvis Presley – lead vocals, acoustic rhythm/lead guitars
- Scotty Moore — electric guitar
- D. J. Fontana — drums
- Hank Garland – six-string bass guitar
- Bob Moore – double bass
- Floyd Cramer – piano
- Boots Randolph – saxophone
- Buddy Harman – drums
- The Jordanaires – backing vocals
