= Bring It Up =

1967 single by James Brown

Single by James Brown

from the album Sings Raw Soul
- B-side: "Nobody Knows"
- Released: January 1967
- Recorded: October 4, 1966, RCA Studios, New York, NY
- Genre: Soul
- Length: 2:45
- Label: King; 6071
- Songwriter(s): James Brown; Nat Jones
- Producer(s): James Brown

James Brown charting singles chronology
"Don't Be a Drop-Out" (1966)	"Bring It Up" (1967)	"Kansas City" (1967)

Audio video
- "Bring It Up" on YouTube

"Bring It Up", also known as "Bring It Up (Hipster's Avenue)", is a song recorded by James Brown. It was released as a single in 1967 and charted No. 7 R&B and No. 29 Pop. It also appeared on the album James Brown Sings Raw Soul. An unedited version of the song was released on the 1991 box set Star Time.

Live performances of the song appear on the albums Live at the Garden and Live at the Apollo, Volume II.

== Chart performance ==
Chart (1967)	Peak position
US Billboard Hot 100	29
US Billboard Top Selling R&B Singles	7
