= Cold Sweat =

"Cold Sweat – Part 1"

Single by James Brown

from the album Cold Sweat
- B-side: "Cold Sweat – Part 2"
- Released: June 1967
- Recorded: May 1967
- Studio: King Studios (Cincinnati, Ohio)
- Genre: Funk
- Length: 2:55 (Part 1); 3:55 (Part 2); 7:30 (album version)
- Label: King; 6110
- Songwriters: James Brown; Alfred Ellis
- Producer: James Brown

James Brown charting singles chronology
"Let Yourself Go" (1967)	"Cold Sweat – Part 1" (1967)	"Get It Together (Part 1)" (1967)

Audio video
- "Cold Sweat Part 1" on YouTube

"Cold Sweat" is a song performed by James Brown and written with his bandleader Alfred "Pee Wee" Ellis. Brown recorded it in May 1967. An edited version of "Cold Sweat" released as a two-part single on King Records was a No. 1 R&B hit, and reached number seven on the Pop Singles chart. The complete recording, more than seven minutes long, was included on an album of the same name.

Brown's lyrics describe how his woman's affections make him "break out in a cold sweat."

In 2016 James Brown's "Cold Sweat-Part 1" was inducted into the Grammy Hall of Fame.

== Creation ==
"Cold Sweat" developed from an earlier James Brown R&B song, "I Don't Care", recorded in 1962 and first released on the album James Brown and His Famous Flames Tour the U.S.A.. According to Brown, "it was a slow, bluesy tune then. It was good that way, but I was really getting into my funk bag now, and it became an almost completely different tune, except for the lyrics." Arranger and co-composer Pee Wee Ellis recalled in an interview that

[a]fter one of the shows, one night somewhere, James called me into the dressing room and grunted a bass line of a rhythmic thing (demonstrates), which turned out to be "Cold Sweat." I was very much influenced by Miles Davis and had been listening to "So What" six or seven years earlier and that crept into the making of "Cold Sweat." You could call it subliminal, but the horn line is based on Miles Davis' "So What." I wrote that on the bus between New York and Cincinnati. The next day we pulled up in front of King Records studio, got off the bus, got in the studio, set up, and I went over the rhythm with the band. By the time we got the groove going, James showed up, added a few touches—changed the guitar part, which made it real funky—had the drummer do something different. He was a genius at it. Between the two of us, we put it together one afternoon. He put the lyrics on it. The band set up in a semicircle in the studio with one microphone. It was recorded live in the studio. One take. It was like a performance. We didn't do overdubbing.

== Analysis ==
Building on the innovations of Brown's earlier songs "Out of Sight" and "Papa's Got a Brand New Bag", "Cold Sweat" was a watershed event in the evolution of funk music. While those songs were both based on a conventional twelve bar blues chord progression, "Cold Sweat" has only one definite chord change, a move to the subtonic at the bridge. As in the earlier songs, all the band's instruments (horns, guitars, etc.) are used percussively in "Cold Sweat", and overwhelming emphasis is put on the first beat of each measure ("on the one"). The main drum part is a two-bar pattern with a snare hit on the two and four beats (a standard 4/4 rock pattern) with a simple variation: the four beat hit in the first measure is delayed by one eighth note. This snare pattern contributed greatly to the funky feel of the arrangement. It was copied, often with embellishments, in later James Brown songs and numerous songs by other musical artists.

"Cold Sweat" is the first recording in which Brown calls for a drum solo (with the famous exclamation "give the drummer some") from Clyde Stubblefield, beginning the tradition of rhythmic "breaks" that would become important in dance music and form the foundation of sampling. It also features a saxophone solo by Maceo Parker.

== Impact ==
Sometimes cited as the first true funk song, "Cold Sweat" was recognized as a radical departure from pop music conventions at the time of its release. Producer Jerry Wexler recalled that "[it] deeply affected the musicians I knew. It just freaked them out. No one could get a handle on what to do next." Cliff White described it as "divorced from all other forms of popular music." Some musicians criticized it as simplistic. Fred Wesley recalled that before he joined Brown's band he "was very unimpressed with ['Cold Sweat']. . . It only had one change, the words made no sense at all, and the bridge was musically incorrect." For the critic Dave Marsh, while acknowledging the song as pivotal, has suggested that "the post-'Cold Sweat' de-emphasis of melody" was partly responsible for a "decline in the number of genuinely memorable songs" in the years since its release.

Brown would continue to develop the rhythmically intense, harmonically static template pioneered on "Cold Sweat" in later recordings such as "I Can't Stand Myself (When You Touch Me)", "I Got the Feelin'", "Mother Popcorn", "Get Up (I Feel Like Being a) Sex Machine", and "Super Bad".

Like many of Brown's funk hits, "Cold Sweat" has been extensively sampled by hip hop DJs and producers. The guitar riff would later be used in Brown's "Mother Popcorn" and Bobby Byrd's "I Know You Got Soul" (co-written and produced by Brown). Two instrumental incarnations of this song were "Bringing Up The Guitar" and "The Popcorn".

== Other recordings ==
Live performances of "Cold Sweat" appear on the albums Live at the Apollo, Volume II (1968), Say It Live and Loud: Live in Dallas 08.26.68 (1998), Live in New York (1981), Soul Session Live (1989), and Live at the Apollo 1995 (1995). Brown re-recorded the song in a jazz-inflected version with the Dee Felice Trio for his 1969 album Gettin' Down to It, and again with a studio band arranged by David Matthews for the 1972 album Get on the Good Foot.

"Cold Sweat" has been covered by a number of performers, notably by Mongo Santamaría on his album Soul Bag in 1968.

== Personnel ==
- James Brown – lead vocal

with the James Brown Orchestra:

- Waymon Reed – trumpet
- Joe Dupars – trumpet
- Levi Rasbury – valve trombone
- Alfred "Pee Wee" Ellis – alto saxophone
- Maceo Parker – tenor saxophone
- Eldee Williams – tenor saxophone
- St. Clair Pinckney – baritone saxophone
- Jimmy Nolen – guitar
- Alfonzo "Country" Kellum – guitar
- Bernard Odum – bass
- Clyde Stubblefield – drums

== Chart positions ==
Chart (1967)	Peak position
U.S. Billboard Hot 100	7
U.S. Billboard R&B	1

== Mono track listing ==
1. "Cold Sweat"

2. "Let Yourself Go"

3. "Good Rockin' Tonight"
