= Out of Sight (album) =

Studio album by James Brown
- Released: September 1964
- Recorded: March 23 – September 15, 1964
- Studios: Bell Sound Studios (New York City, New York); Universal Studios (Chicago, Illinois)
- Genres: Soul, R&B, funk
- Length: 34:43
- Label: Smash
- Producer: James Brown

James Brown chronology
Grits & Soul (1964)	Out of Sight (1964)	Papa's Got a Brand New Bag (1965)

Singles from Out of Sight
- 1. "Out of Sight" Released: July 1964

Professional ratings
Review scores
Source	Rating
AllMusic	3/5 stars

Out of Sight is the ninth studio album by American musician James Brown. The album was released in September 1964, by Smash Records.

== Track listing ==
No.	Title	Writer(s)	Length
1.	"Out of Sight"	Ted Wright	2:22
2.	"Come Rain or Come Shine"	Harold Arlen, Johnny Mercer	2:51
3.	"Good Rockin' Tonight"	Roy Brown	2:30
4.	"Till Then"	Eddie Seiler, Guy Wood, Sol Marcus	2:41
5.	"Nature Boy"	Eden Ahbez	2:41
6.	"I Wanna Be Around" (featuring New York Studio Orchestra & Chorus)	Johnny Mercer, Sadie Vimmerstedt	2:23
7.	"I Got You"	Ted Wright	2:27
8.	"Maybe the Last Time"	Ted Wright	2:56
9.	"Mona Lisa"		1:57
10.	"I Loves You, Porgy"	George Gershwin, DuBose Heyward	2:33
11.	"Only You"	Ande Rand, Buck Ram	2:50
12.	"Somethin' Else"	Ted Wright	6:33

== Personnel ==
- James Brown – lead vocal, organ ("Somethin' Else"), piano ("Maybe the Last Time")
- Maeretha Stewart, Bobby Byrd, Eugene “Baby Lloyd” Stallworth, Bobby Bennett and others unidentified – background vocals
- Ernie Royal, Dud Bascomb, Johnny Grimes, McKinley "Mack" Johnson, Teddy Washington, Ron Tooley, Joe Dupars – trumpet
- Richard Harris, probably Wilmer Milton – trombone
- George Dorsey, Nat Jones – alto saxophone
- St. Clair Pinckney, Eldee Williams, Al “Brisco” Clark, Seldon Powell, Sam “The Man” Taylor or Jerome Richardson – tenor saxophone
- Haywood Henry, Maceo Parker – baritone saxophone
- Ernie Hayes, Bobby Byrd, possibly Lucas "Fats" Gonder – organ
- unknown – strings
- Billy Butler, Wallace Richardson, Les Buie, possibly Carl Lynch – guitar
- Al Lucas, Sam Thomas or Bernard Odum – bass
- Panama Francis, Melvin Parker, Obie Williams, Nat Kendrick – drums
