= Prisoner of Love (James Brown album) =

Studio album by James Brown
- Released: September 1963
- Recorded: September 18, 1958 – December 17, 1962
- Studio: Beltone Studios (New York City, New York); King Studios (Cincinnati, Ohio); Bell Sound Studios (New York City, New York)
- Genre: Soul
- Length: 33:17
- Label: King
- Producer: James Brown

James Brown chronology
James Brown and His Famous Flames Tour the U.S.A. (1962)	Prisoner of Love (1963)	Showtime (1964)

Singles from Prisoner of Love
- 1. "Prisoner of Love" Released: April 1963; 2. "Signed, Sealed and Delivered" Released: September 1963; 3. "Again" Released: April 1964; 4. "So Long" Released: June 1964

Professional ratings
Review scores
Source	Rating
AllMusic	3/5 stars
The Rolling Stone Album Guide	3/5 stars

Prisoner of Love is the sixth studio album by American musician James Brown. The album was released in September 1963, by King Records.

== Chart performance ==
The album debuted on Billboard magazine's Top LP's chart in the issue dated September 28, 1963, peaking at No. 73 during a seventeen-week run on the chart.

== Track listing ==
No.	Title	Writer(s)	Length
1.	"Prisoner of Love"	Russ Columbo, Clarence Gaskill, Leo Robin	2:21
2.	"Waiting In Vain"	Ivy Jo Hunter	2:44
3.	"Again"	Lionel Newman, Dorcas Cochran	2:32
4.	"Lost Someone"	James Brown, Bobby Byrd, Baby Lloyd Stallworth	3:22
5.	"Bewildered"	Teddy Powell, Leonard Whitcup	2:26
6.	"So Long"	Remus Harris, Russ Morgan, Irving Melsher	2:45
7.	"Signed, Sealed and Delivered"	Cowboy Copas, Lois Mann	2:41
8.	"Try Me"	James Brown	2:32
9.	"(Can You) Feel It, Pt. 1"	James Brown	2:54
10.	"How Long Darling"	James Brown	2:53
11.	"The Thing In "G""	James Brown	6:07

== Charts ==
Chart (1963)	Peak position
US Billboard Top LPs	73
