= Live at the Apollo 1995 =

Live album

Live album by James Brown
- Released: July 18, 1995
- Recorded: September 1994
- Venue: Apollo Theater, New York, NY
- Genre: Soul, funk
- Length: 74:43
- Label: Scotti Bros.
- Producer: Brown

James Brown live albums chronology
Love Power Peace: Live at the Olympia, Paris, 1971 (1992)	Live at the Apollo 1995 (1995)	Say It Live and Loud: Live in Dallas 08.26.68 (1998)

Live at the Apollo 1995 is a live album by James Brown. It was the fourth and final album he recorded at Harlem's Apollo Theater. Contrary to the title, it was recorded in 1994, 32 years after the original Live at the Apollo. It includes one studio track, "Respect Me".

Live at the Apollo 1995 was the last live album James Brown recorded.

== Track listing ==
No.	Title	Writer(s)	Length
1.	"Intro"		1:59
2.	"Cold Sweat (Part 1)"	James Brown, Alfred Ellis	4:54
3.	"Gonna Have a Funky Good Time"	Brown	3:51
4.	"It's a Man's World"	Brown, Betty Newsome	11:19
5.	"Get Up Offa That Thing"	Brown, Ira Newborn	3:41
6.	"Try Me"	Brown	3:47
7.	"The Payback"	Brown, Fred Wesley, John Starks	0:36
8.	"Hot Pants (She Got to Use What She Got, to Get What She Wants)"	Brown, Fred Wesley	1:49
9.	"Prisoner of Love"	Leo Robin, Russ Columbo, Clarence Gaskill	1:36
10.	"Papa's Got a Brand New Bag"	Brown	4:43
11.	"Living in America"	Dan Hartman, Charlie Midnight	3:49
12.	"Make It Funky"	Brown, Charles Bobbit	8:04
13.	"Get on the Good Foot"	Brown, Fred Wesley, Joseph Mims	2:38
14.	"Georgia on My Mind"	Hoagy Carmichael, Stuart Gorrell	2:35
15.	"Georgia-Lina"	Brown, "Sweet" Charles Sherrell	4:39
16.	"(I Got You) I Feel Good"	Brown	2:36
17.	"Please Please Please"	Brown, Johnny Terry	3:01
18.	"Get Up (I Feel Like Being a) Sex Machine"	Bobby Byrd, Ronald Lenhoff, James Brown	5:16
19.	"Respect Me" (New bonus track)	Brown, Derrick Monk	3:41
Total length:			74:43

== Reception ==
Professional ratings
Review scores
Source	Rating
AllMusic	2.5/5 stars
Entertainment Weekly	B+
Robert Christgau	3/5 stars

The album was not as well received as previous albums in the series.
