= Eddie Freeman (musician) =

Edward F. Freeman
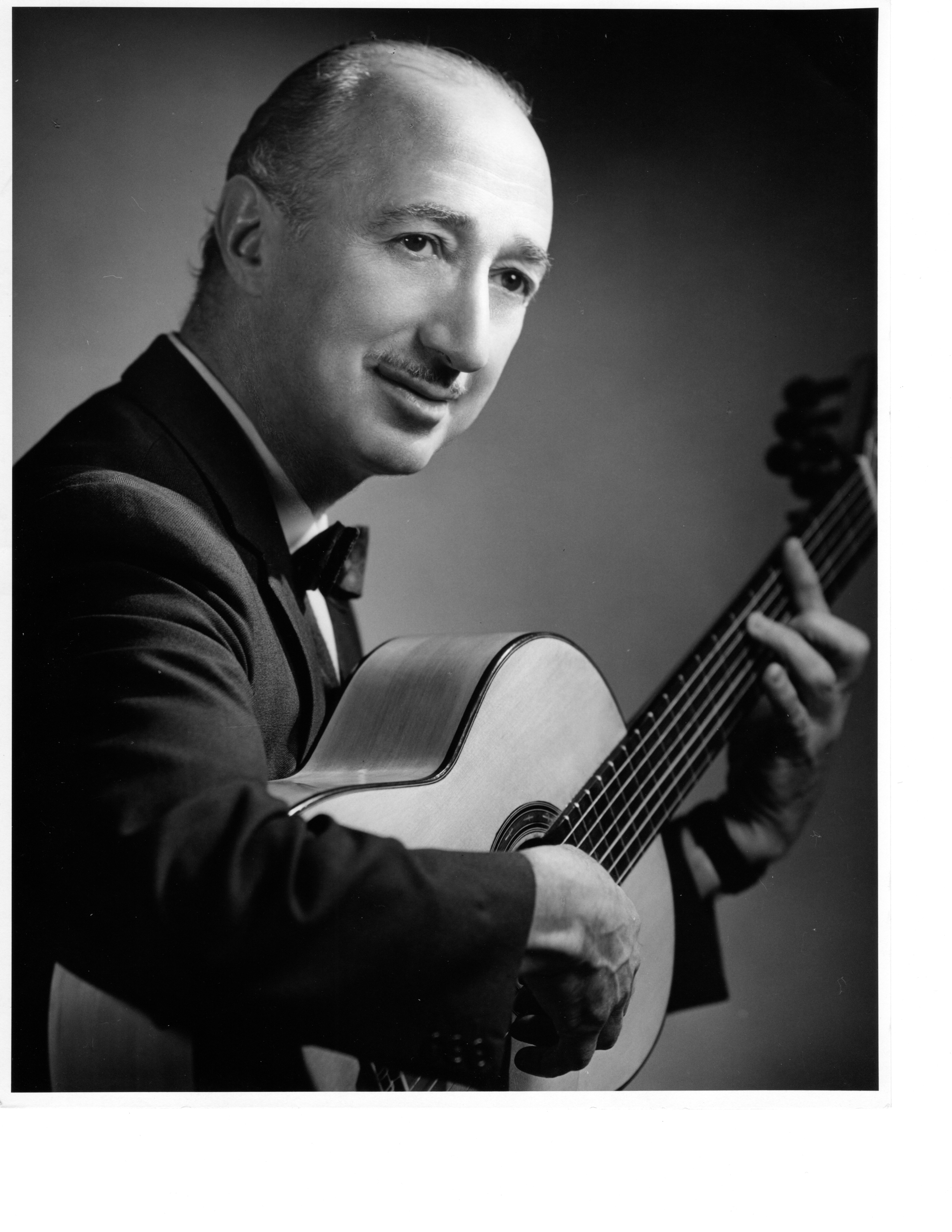
- Eddie Freeman with Freeman flamenco guitar (Photograph by Raiberto Comini)

Background information
- Born: Edward F. Freeman; 10 November 1909
- Origin: London, England
- Died: 23 November 1987 (aged 78)
- Genres: Jazz, Flamenco music
- Occupation: Guitarist
- Instruments: Guitar, Tenor banjo

Edward F. Freeman (10 November 1909 – 23 November 1987) was a noted English jazz musician of the first half of the 20th century and a transcriber and teacher of flamenco guitar music in the latter half. Born in London, England, the jazz guitarist and flamenco enthusiast spent time pursuing his music career in England, Spain, and the United States, eventually moving to Dallas, Texas, where he lived with his family until his death in 1987. His experience playing the tenor banjo led him to create the "Eddie Freeman Special 4-String Guitar" for the Selmer Music Company, and towards the end of his career, he made accurate transcriptions of the music of famous flamenco guitarists, taught flamenco guitar,.and designed and constructed his own flamenco and classical guitars.

== Biography ==
Eddie learned to play violin at the age of 12 and became a professional violinist in pit orchestras of silent movie houses in England. While playing in movie houses he took up the tenor banjo. To better master that instrument, he travelled to the United States, where he played with Ricardo Giannoni in New York; with a dance orchestra in Baltimore at the Summit Roadhouse near the Pimlico Racetrack; in a Harlem speakeasy; and in engagements with Billy Lustig and the Scranton Sirens.

During this period he found it necessary to abandon the tenor banjo in favour of the six string guitar which was coming into favour. While convalescing from an illness in Baltimore, he developed a method for adapting the tenor banjo techniques to the guitar, which later led to his development of a four-string tenor guitar, the Eddie Freeman Special, using his new method.

He returned to London to play in the Harry Roy Orchestra at the London Pavilion. When noted bandleader Al Collins, heard of Freeman and listened to him play, Collins signed him up for his orchestra at the Savoy Hotel in London. When Collins switched to the Berkeley Hotel in 1932, Freeman went with him.

In the early 1930s, Freeman designed the "Eddie Freeman Special 4-String Guitar" for Selmer Music Company, to implement the guitar method he had developed in Baltimore. One of the Selmer-Maccaferri guitars, the Eddie Freeman Special had the scale-length and body-size of a standard guitar, and used a reentrant CGDA tuning, that had a better sound for rhythm guitar than the normal tenor guitar with its very high A. Since it was still tuned CGDA, it could be played by tenor banjoists. Selmer-Maccaferri tenor guitars were produced from 1932 until 1934. Nearly 100 of the some 300 genuine Maccaferri guitars that were built were Eddie Freeman Specials.

The guitar was not a commercial success, despite heavy promotion by Maccaferri, because of opposition from orchestra guitarists in England who thought it was a threat to their livelihoods. However, in recent years some luthiers such as the late David Hodson in the UK have started building this four string model again because of demand from their customers.

Freeman spent the war years in Belfast playing trumpet and conducting a seven-piece Dixie combo in The Embassy Club. After the war he played trumpet in the Knightsbridge South American Club in London, and doubled with jazz guitar in the Bag O'Nails Club.

Freeman moved to the Bronx in New York in the mid-1940s and was joined by his wife and two children in 1946. By the early 1950s they had moved to Oceanside, California where he supported himself as a piano tuner. Inspired by flamenco music, which he first heard at the Savoy Hotel, he left his family in California and travelled to Spain to discover its fundamentals. His search was interrupted when he played violin in the Palma de Majorca Symphony, but in Palma he met guitarist Manolo Baron from whom he learned the basics of flamenco. He later formed a flamenco group, Los Tres de Sevilla, with two dancers.

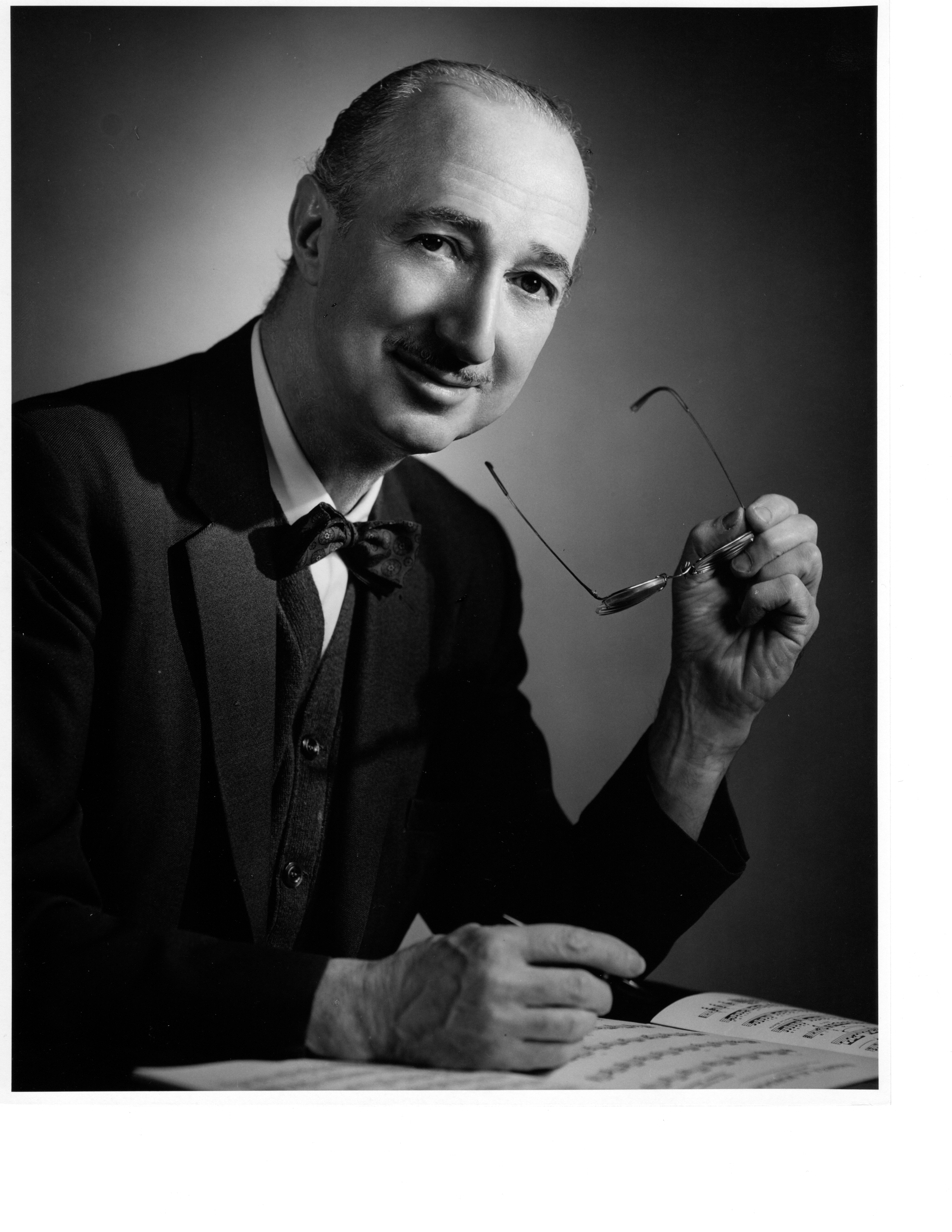
Eddie Freeman with manuscript of a transcription (Photograph by Raiberto Comini)

When he returned to the US he moved his family to Dallas, Texas, where wrote, performed, transcribed and perfected his knowledge of flamenco. He made accurate transcriptions of the finest flamenco guitarists: Ramon Montoya, Sabicas, Mario Escudero, Carlos Ramos, Esteban de Sanlucar, Nino Ricardo, and Paco de Lucia. His earliest publication of a flamenco transcription was of a soleares by Esteban de Sanlucar in Issue number 19 of The Guitar Review in 1956, the same year in which he registered his first US copyrights for his transcriptions. He subsequently published a collection of transcriptions of guitar solos (Guajiras, Petenera, and Malaguena) by Carlos Ramos (1967) through Charles H. Hansen Company.

Freeman developed a system for teaching Flamenco guitar that differed dramatically from the traditional method in which the student learns by watching the teacher's fingerboard and copying what he is doing. Instead, Freeman insisted that his students learn to read standard music notation, and devised a very simple approach for teaching reading and basic music theory starting with the first lesson in a carefully graded sequence of familiar classical pieces and the Flamenco solos that he had transcribed. Each piece in the library of music that formed the basis of his system was carefully selected to develop a particular aspect of technique or understanding of Flamenco in a logical progression.

In addition to transcribing and teaching flamenco guitar, Freeman designed and constructed his own flamenco and classical guitars. The entire January 1980 edition of Jaleo, the newsletter of the Flamenco Association of San Diego, was dedicated to articles about him written by his students and family members.

== Discography ==
With James Brown

- Please Please Please (King, 1958)
- Try Me! (King, 1959)

== See also ==
- Flamenco
- Tenor banjo
- Maccaferri guitars
