= Soul Donkey =

Studio album by The Sugarman 3
- Released: 2000
- Genre: Funk, Jazz
- Length: 39:03
- Label: Desco

The Sugarman 3 chronology
Sugar's Boogaloo (1999)	Soul Donkey (2000)	Sweet Spot (2001)

Professional ratings
Review scores
Source	Rating
AllMusic	3.5/5 stars

Soul Donkey is the second album by the Sugarman 3, released in 2000. It was re-released in 2006 by Daptone Records. It differs somewhat from the band's previous album by focusing more on funk/jazz instrumentals.

== Critical reception ==
The Plain Dealer deemed the album "laid-back yet percolating."

== Track listing ==
1. Soul Donkey - 3:48
2. Chicken Half - 3:32
3. Baby I Love You - 4:53
4. Turtle Walk - 4:01
5. Daisy Rides Again - 3:16
6. Double Back - 4:53
7. Pull My Cart - 3:41
8. Mulin' Around - 3:20
9. Saddle for Two - 3:12
10. Out a Sight - 2:21
11. So Long Donkey - 2:06
