= Sugar's Boogaloo =

Studio album by The Sugarman 3
- Released: 1998
- Genre: Funk, jazz
- Length: 37:02
- Label: Desco Records

The Sugarman 3 chronology
Sugar's Boogaloo (1998)	Soul Donkey (2000)

Professional ratings
Review scores
Source	Rating
AllMusic	4/5 stars

Sugar's Boogaloo is the debut album by the Sugarman 3. It was released by Desco Records in 1998. It was re-released in 2006 by Daptone Records.

== Critical reception ==
AllMusic wrote that "fans of earthy, greasy jazz-funk and rare groove will delight in the fact that this music is being revived -- and in such danceable, soulful fashion."

== Track listing ==
1. Sugar's Boogaloo - 3:07
2. Papa's Got a Brand New Bag - 2:58
3. Sock Monkey - 4:05
4. Sunshine Superman - 3:43
5. Skunk Walk - 3:31
6. Susie Q - 4:17
7. Sweeth Tooth - 3:55
8. Red Wine - 4:16
9. Hot Sauce - 2:57
10. Hankerin' - 4:31
