= James Brown Plays the Real Thing =

Studio album by James Brown
- Released: June 1967
- Recorded: April 4–6, 1967
- Studio: Bell Sound Studios (New York City, New York)
- Genre: Soul
- Length: 42:04
- Label: Smash; 67093
- Producer: James Brown

James Brown chronology
James Brown Sings Raw Soul (1967)	James Brown Plays the Real Thing (1967)	Cold Sweat (1967)

Singles from James Brown Plays the Real Thing
- 1. "Jimmy Mack" Released: June 1967

Professional ratings
Review scores
Source	Rating
AllMusic	3/5 stars
The Rolling Stone Album Guide	3/5 stars

James Brown Plays the Real Thing is the sixteenth studio album by American musician James Brown. The album was released in June 1967, by Smash Records. The entire album was arranged by Pee Wee Ellis, who'd joined the band a year prior.

The album debuted on Billboard magazine's Top LP's chart in the issue dated July 15, 1967, peaking at No. 164 during a five-week run on the chart.

== Track listing ==
No.	Title	Writer(s)	Length
1.	"Jimmy Mack"	Holland-Dozier-Holland	5:26
2.	"What Do You Like"	Alfred Ellis	7:24
3.	"PeeWee's Groove In "D"" (featuring Pee Wee Ellis)	Alfred Ellis	5:10
4.	"Bernadette"	Holland-Dozier-Holland	3:05
5.	"Mercy, Mercy, Mercy"	Joe Zawinul	5:01
6.	"I Never Loved a Man The Way I Love You"	Ronnie Shannon	4:35
7.	"Funky Broadway"	Arlester Christian	5:43
8.	"'D' Thing"	Ted Wright	5:40

== Personnel ==
- James Brown – organ
- Richard Harris, Jimmy Cleveland, Garnett Brown – trombone
- Pee Wee Ellis – alto saxophone, arrangement
- St. Clair Pinckney, Alfred Corley – tenor saxophone
- St. Clair Pinckney – baritone saxophone
- Ernie Hayes – piano
- Jimmy Nolen, Carl Lynch or Wallace Richardson – guitar
- Al Lucas or Jimmy Tyrell – bass
- Bernard Purdie – drums

== Charts ==
Chart (1967)	Peak position
US Billboard Top LPs	164
