= James Brown and His Famous Flames Tour the U.S.A. =

Studio album by James Brown and The Famous Flames
- Released: September 1962
- Recorded: February 9, 1961 – July 31, 1962
- Studio: Dukoff Studios (Miami, Florida) ("Cross Firing", "Every Beat of My Heart"); King Studios (Cincinnati, Ohio) (remainder of titles)
- Genre: Soul
- Length: 33:07
- Label: King
- Producer: James Brown

James Brown and The Famous Flames chronology
Good, Good, Twistin' (1962)	James Brown and His Famous Flames Tour the U.S.A. (1962)	Prisoner of Love (1963)

Singles from James Brown and His Famous Flames Tour the U.S.A.
- 1. "Mashed Potatoes U.S.A." Released: August 1962; 2. "Three Hearts in a Tangle" Released: November 1962; 3. "Like a Baby / Every Beat of My Heart" Released: January 1963

Professional ratings
Review scores
Source	Rating
The Rolling Stone Album Guide	2.5/5 stars

James Brown and His Famous Flames Tour the U.S.A. is the fifth studio album by American musician James Brown and The Famous Flames. The album was released in 1962, by King Records.

== Track listing ==
All tracks composed by James Brown; except where indicated

No.	Title	Writer(s)	Length
1.	"Mashed Potatoes U.S.A."		2:51
2.	"Choo-Choo Locomotion"		2:52
3.	"Three Hearts In A Tangle"	Ray Pennington, Sonny Thompson	2:52
4.	"Doin' the Limbo"		2:27
5.	"I Don't Care"		2:50
6.	"Joggin' Along"		2:24
7.	"I've Got Money"		2:29
8.	"Sticky"	James Brown, J.C. Davis	2:46
9.	"Like a Baby"	Jesse Stone	2:51
10.	"Every Beat of My Heart"	Johnny Otis	3:34
11.	"In the Wee Wee Hours (Of the Nite)"		2:50
12.	"Cross Firing"		2:21

== Personnel ==
- James Brown – lead vocals
- Bobby Byrd, Baby Lloyd Stallworth, Bobby Bennett – backing vocals ("Three Hearts In A Tangle")
- Roscoe Patrick, Teddy Washington, Lewis Hamlin – trumpet
- Clarence "Jay" Johnson – trombone
- J.C. Davis, St. Clair Pinckney, Al "Brisco" Clark, Clifford "Ace King" MacMillan – tenor saxophone
- Al "Brisco" Clark – baritone saxophone
- James Brown ("Cross Firing", "Every Beat of My Heart"), Bobby Byrd – organ
- Bobby Byrd – piano ("I Don't Care")
- Les Buie – guitar
- Hubert Lee Perry – bass
- James Brown ("Choo-Choo Locomotion"), Nat Kendrick, Clayton Fillyau – drums
