= Mashed Potatoes U.S.A. =

Single by James Brown and his Famous Flames

from the album James Brown and His Famous Flames Tour the U.S.A.
- B-side: "You Don't Have to Go"
- Released: August 4, 1962
- Recorded: May 22, 1962
- Studio: King Studios (Cincinnati, Ohio)
- Genre: Rhythm and blues
- Length: 2:49
- Label: King; 5672
- Songwriter: James Brown

James Brown and his Famous Flames singles chronology
"Shout and Shimmy" (1962)	"Mashed Potatoes U.S.A." (1962)	"Three Hearts in a Tangle" (1962)

Audio video
- "Mashed Potatoes U.S.A." on YouTube

"Mashed Potatoes U.S.A." is a rhythm and blues song by James Brown and his Famous Flames. Released on August 4, 1962 as a single by King Records and later on the album James Brown and His Famous Flames Tour the U.S.A., it reached #82 on the Pop chart and #21 on the R&B chart. The title refers to the Mashed Potato dance popular at the time.

Inspired by Freddie King's "San-Ho-Zay" James Brown recorded "James Brown House Party" in January 1962. This song was left shelved until May 22, 1962 when he re-recorded the song under the title "Limbo Jimbo". After the recording session ended Brown suddenly decided to record a spoken vocal track over it about doing the Mashed Potatoes which would finally realise the song as "Mashed Potatoes U.S.A.".

The song is a travelogue set over a strummed guitar/organ riff with a muted trumpet providing a jazz counterpoint to the vocal delivery. The bridge consists of the entire band repeating a two-chord riff.

In the song, Brown asserts "Here I am and I'm back again," then states his plan to bring the mashed potatoes to the cities he will tour. He then name checks his itinerary, starting with New York City and ending with his home town, Augusta, Georgia, which he misspells as A-G-U-S-T-A.

The instrumental version entitled "Limbo Jimbo" was released in early 1963 as part of the King published album A Carnival Of Songs while the original January 1962 recording of the song entitled "James Brown House Party" was released on the Mighty Instrumentals album in 1966.

"Mashed Potatoes U.S.A." was reissued as a limited edition single by King Records in 1967 under the name "Mashed Potatoes '66".

== Personnel ==
- James Brown – lead vocal, organ
- Roscoe Patrick – muted trumpet
- St. Clair Pinckney – tenor saxophone
- Clifford "Ace King" MacMillan – tenor saxophone
- Al "Brisco" Clark – baritone saxophone
- Les Buie – guitar
- Hubert Perry – bass
- Clayton Fillyau – drums

== See also ==
- "(Do the) Mashed Potatoes"
