= Please Please Please (album) =

Studio album by James Brown and the Famous Flames
- Released: December 1958
- Recorded: February 4, 1956 – September 18, 1958
- Studio: King (Cincinnati, Ohio); Beltone (New York City)
- Genre: R&B; soul
- Length: 40:36
- Label: King
- Producer: Ralph Bass

James Brown and the Famous Flames chronology
Please Please Please (1958)	Try Me! (1959)

Singles from Please Please Please
- 1. "Please, Please, Please" Released: February 1956; 2. "I Don't Know" Released: June 1956; 3. "No, No, No, No" Released: August 1956; 4. "Just Won't Do Right" Released: January 1957; 5. "That Dood It" Released: November 1957; 6. "Begging, Begging" Released: February 1958; 7. "Try Me" Released: October 1958

Please Please Please is the debut studio album by the Famous Flames under the billing "James Brown and His Famous Flames", featuring the first album of recordings during Brown's long career. It was released in December 1958 by King Records and includes the group's first two hit singles, the title track and "Try Me" (R&B No. 1, Pop No. 48), along with all the non-charting singles and B-sides they had recorded up to that time. The album was reissued in 2003 by Polydor on a Japanese 24-bit remastered import CD packaged in a miniature LP sleeve.

Professional ratings
Review scores
Source	Rating
AllMusic	3/5 stars
The Encyclopedia of Popular Music	3/5 stars
The Rolling Stone Album Guide	3/5 stars
Martin C. Strong	6/10

== Track listing ==
All tracks are written by James Brown; except where indicated.

Side one
No.	Title	Writer(s)	Length
1.	"Please, Please, Please"	Brown, John Terry	2:47
2.	"Chonnie-On-Chon"	Brown, Bobby Byrd, Nafloyd Scott, Wilbert Smith	2:13
3.	"Hold My Baby's Hand"	Brown, Trevor Smith	2:14
4.	"I Feel That Old Feeling Coming On"	Nashpendle Knox, Nafloyd Scott	2:35
5.	"Just Won't Do Right"		2:37
6.	"Baby Cries Over the Ocean"		2:38
7.	"I Don't Know"	Brown, John Terry	2:48
8.	"Tell Me What I Did Wrong"		2:23

Side two
No.	Title	Writer(s)	Length
1.	"Try Me"		2:33
2.	"That Dood It"	Rudy Toombs, Rose Marie McCoy	2:29
3.	"Begging, Begging"	Julius Dixson, Rudy Toombs	2:54
4.	"I Walked Alone"	Nashpendle Knox, Nafloyd Scott	2:43
5.	"No, No, No, No"		2:15
6.	"That's When I Lost My Heart"		2:52
7.	"Let's Make It"		2:27
8.	"Love or a Game"		2:15

== Personnel ==
Musicians

- James Brown – lead vocals

The Famous Flames

- Bobby Byrd – backing vocals, piano
- Johnny Terry – backing vocals
- Sylvester Keels – backing vocals
- Nashpendle Knox – backing vocals
- Bill Hollings – backing vocals
- J.W. Archer – backing vocals
- Louis Madison – backing vocals, piano
- Nafloyd Scott – guitar

Additional personnel

- George Dorsey – alto saxophone
- Ray Felder, Cleveland Lowe, Wilbert “Lee Diamond” Smith, Clifford Scott, Hal Singer – tenor saxophone
- Lucas "Fats" Gonder, Ernie Hayes – piano
- Kenny Burrell, John Faire, Eddie Freeman, Thomas Gable, Bobby Roach – guitar
- Edwyn Conley, Clarence Mack, Carl Pruitt – bass
- Panama Francis, Edison Gore, Reginald Hall – drums
