= I Want You So Bad (James Brown song) =

Single by James Brown

from the album Try Me!
- B-side: "There Must Be a Reason"
- Released: 1959
- Recorded: 1958
- Studio: Master Recorders, Hollywood, CA
- Genre: Rhythm and blues
- Length: 2:41
- Label: Federal; 12348
- Songwriter(s): James Brown
- Producer(s): unknown

James Brown charting singles chronology
"Try Me" (1958)	"I Want You So Bad" (1959)	"I'll Go Crazy" (1960)

Audio video
- "I Want You So Bad" on YouTube

"I Want You So Bad" is a rhythm and blues song written and recorded by James Brown. Released as a single in 1959, it charted #20 R&B. It was Brown's third R&B hit and his first that did not feature vocal backing from The Famous Flames, although they received credit on the label.
