= Grits & Soul =

Studio album by James Brown
- Released: August 1964
- Recorded: May 1964; August 1964
- Studio: probably Bell Sound Studios (New York City, New York); Criteria Studios (Miami, Florida)
- Genre: Soul
- Length: 37:47
- Label: Smash
- Producer: James Brown

James Brown chronology
Showtime (1964)	Grits & Soul (1964)	Out of Sight (1964)

Singles from Grits & Soul
- 1. "Devil's Hideaway" Released: March 1965

Professional ratings
Review scores
Source	Rating
AllMusic	3/5 stars
Record Mirror	3/5 stars
The Rolling Stone Album Guide	2.5/5 stars

Grits & Soul is the eighth studio album by American musician James Brown. The album was released in August of 1964 by Smash Records. Brown does not sing on the album; he was sidestepping his contract obligations with King Records. Instead, Brown plays keyboards. This is the first known recording of Maceo Parker, seen on the right of the album cover, at this point on baritone saxophone. Nat Jones, at left on the cover, is one of four Kinston, NC musicians performing on the album, with Maceo Parker's brother Melvin on drums and Robert Knight on trumpet.

== Chart performance ==
The album debuted on Billboard magazine's Top LP's chart in the issue dated April 10, 1965, peaking at No. 124 during a ten-week run on the chart.

== Track listing ==
All tracks composed by James Brown as "Ted Wright"; except where indicated

No.	Title	Writer(s)	Length
1.	"Grits"	Nat Jones, Ted Wright	4:01
2.	"Tempted"		3:10
3.	"There"		3:30
4.	"After You're Through"		3:05
5.	"Devil's Hideaway"		5:13
6.	"Who's Afraid of Virginia Woolf?"	Don Kirkpatrick, Kevin Knox	4:46
7.	"Infatuation"	Nat Jones, Ted Wright	4:28
8.	"Wee Wee"		2:35
9.	"Mister Hip"		4:35
10.	"Headache"		2:22

== Personnel ==
- James Brown – organ
- McKinley "Mack" Johnson, Teddy Washington, Ron Tooley, Joe Dupars, Robert Knight – trumpet
- Wilmer Milton – trombone
- Nat Jones – alto saxophone, arrangement
- St. Clair Pinckney, Eldee Williams, Al Brisco Clark – tenor saxophone
- Maceo Parker – baritone saxophone
- Bobby Byrd or Lucas “Fats” Gonder – piano, organ
- Les Buie – guitar
- probably Sam Thomas – bass
- Melvin Parker, Obie Williams, Nat Kendrick – drums

== Charts ==
Chart (1965)	Peak position
US Billboard Top LPs	124
