= Through the Storm (Aretha Franklin album) =

1989 studio album by Aretha Franklin

Studio album by Aretha Franklin
- Released: May, 1989
- Recorded: April 1988 – August 1988
- Studios: Tarpan Studios (San Rafael, California); Sunset Sound Recorders, Sound Labs and Cherokee Studios (Hollywood, California); Lion Share Studios (Los Angeles, California); United Sound Systems (Detroit, Michigan); The Power Station, Greene St. Recording Studios and Atlantic Studios (New York City, New York)
- Genres: Pop; rock; R&B
- Length: 35:16
- Label: Arista
- Producers: Narada Michael Walden; Arif Mardin; Joe Mardin; Aretha Franklin; Jerry Knight; Aaron Zigman

Aretha Franklin chronology
One Lord, One Faith, One Baptism (1987)	Through the Storm (1989)	What You See Is What You Sweat (1991)

Singles from Through the Storm
- 1. "If Ever a Love There Was" Released: 1988; 2. "Through the Storm" Released: March 17, 1989; 3. "It Isn't, It Wasn't, It Ain't Never Gonna Be" Released: June 10, 1989; 4. "Gimme Your Love" Released: September 18, 1989

Professional ratings
Review scores
Source	Rating
AllMusic	3/5 stars
Artist direct	3/5 stars
Robert Christgau	B+
MSN Music	3.5/5 stars
Number One	4/5 stars

Through the Storm is the thirty-second studio album by American singer Aretha Franklin. It was released mid 1989 on the Arista Records label.

The title track (a duet with Elton John) was released as the album's second single, reaching number 16 on the US Billboard Hot 100. Despite its success, the album was ultimately unsuccessful, peaking at number 55 on the Billboard 200, after spending 18 weeks on the chart.

The follow-up single, "It Isn't, It Wasn't, It Ain't Never Gonna Be", (a duet with Whitney Houston), failed to reach the top 40 of the Billboard Hot 100, peaking at number 41.

The album's final single, "Gimme Your Love" (a duet with James Brown) was poorly received, failing to chart on the Billboard Hot 100, and only managing a peak of number 48 on the R&B Songs chart.

Other guest artists on the album include The Four Tops and Kenny G.

The album was remastered and re-released as an "Expanded Edition" in December 2014 by Funky Town Grooves, with bonus tracks and a second CD of remixes.

== Track listing ==
Side one
No.	Title	Writer(s)	Length
1.	"Gimme Your Love" (duet with James Brown)	Narada Michael Walden; Jeffrey Cohen	5:19
2.	"Mercy"	Siedah Garrett; Glen Ballard	4:09
3.	"He's the Boy"	Aretha Franklin	4:06
4.	"It Isn't, It Wasn't, It Ain't Never Gonna Be" (duet with Whitney Houston)	Albert Hammond; Diane Warren	5:39

Side two
No.	Title	Writer(s)	Length
5.	"Through the Storm" (duet with Elton John)	Albert Hammond; Diane Warren	4:21
6.	"Think (1989)"	Aretha Franklin; Ted White	3:39
7.	"Come to Me"	Willard Eugene Price	3:43
8.	"If Ever a Love There Was" (with the Four Tops and Kenny G)	Pamela Phillips Oland; Todd Cerney	4:47

2014 "Expanded Edition" CD1 bonus tracks
No.	Title	Length
9.	"Gimme Your Love" (Single Version)	4:28
10.	"Gimme Your Love" (Extended Remix – Purple Mix)	10:46
11.	"Gimme Your Love" (The Purple Mix Edit)	4:52
12.	"Gimme Your Love" (The Purple Mix Part One)	5:55
13.	"Gimme Your Love" (The Purple Mix Part Two)	3:11
14.	"Aretha Franklin & James Brown Interview"	2:54

2014 "Expanded Edition" CD2 bonus tracks
No.	Title	Length
1.	"It Isn't, It Wasn't, It Ain't Never Gonna Be" (Album Edit)	4:51
2.	"It Isn't, It Wasn't, It Ain't Never Gonna Be" (Single Version)	4:15
3.	"It Isn't, It Wasn't, It Ain't Never Gonna Be" (Single Remix)	4:04
4.	"It Isn't, It Wasn't, It Ain't Never Gonna Be" (Extended Radio Mix)	6:11
5.	"It Isn't, It Wasn't, It Ain't Never Gonna Be" (House Radio Mix)	5:08
6.	"It Isn't, It Wasn't, It Ain't Never Gonna Be" (Hip Hop Radio Mix)	4:54
7.	"It Isn't, It Wasn't, It Ain't Never Gonna Be" (New Jack Swing Dub Mix)	6:21
8.	"It Isn't, It Wasn't, It Ain't Never Gonna Be" (After Hours Club Mix)	7:42
9.	"It Isn't, It Wasn't, It Ain't Never Gonna Be" (1989 Vogue Dub Mix)	5:38
10.	"It Isn't, It Wasn't, It Ain't Never Gonna Be" (Nic Mercy's 1999 House Mix)	8:38
11.	"It Isn't, It Wasn't, It Ain't Never Gonna Be" (Detroit Rough Mix)	6:11

== Personnel ==
Musicians

- Aretha Franklin – vocals, acoustic piano (3)
- Walter Afanasieff – keyboards (1, 4, 5), synth bass (1), synthesizers (2, 4, 5), bass (2, 4, 5), drum programming (2, 4, 5)
- Ren Klyce – Fairlight CMI (1, 2, 4, 5)
- Robbie Kondor – synthesizers (3), acoustic piano (6), additional synthesizers (6)
- Joe Mardin – programming (6), sequencing (6), horn arrangements and conductor (6)
- David Foster – electric piano (7), synthesizers (7)
- David Paich – acoustic piano (7)
- Aaron Zigman – keyboards (8)
- Corrado Rustici – guitars (1), rhythm guitar (5)
- Steve Khan – guitars (3)
- Doc Powell – guitars (3)
- Reggie Griffin – guitars (6)
- Louis Johnson – bass (3, 7)
- Jerry Knight – bass (8)
- "Bongo" Bob Smith – drum programming (1)
- Narada Michael Walden – drums (1), Simmons pads (1), additional synthesizers (2), additional drums (2), rhythm arrangements (2)
- Yogi Horton – drums (3)
- Sammy Merendino – additional drum samples (6)
- Jeff Porcaro – drums (7)
- John Robinson – drums (8)
- Gigi Gonaway – Paiste cymbals (2)
- Steve Kroon – percussion (3)
- George Devens – percussion (7)
- Marc Russo – saxophone solo (1, 2)
- Kenneth Hitchcock – baritone saxophone (6)
- Andy Snitzer – tenor saxophone (6)
- Kenny G – saxophone solo (8)
- Mike Davis – trombone (6)
- Chris Botti – trumpet (6)
- Kent Smith – trumpet (6)

Background and Guest vocalists

- James Brown – vocals (1)
- Liz Jackson – backing vocals (1)
- Skyler Jett – backing vocals (1, 5)
- Kitty Beethoven – backing vocals (2, 4, 5)
- Siedah Garrett – backing vocals (2)
- Whitney Houston – vocals (4)
- Melisa Kary – backing vocals (4, 5)
- Elton John – vocals (5)
- Claytoven Richardson – backing vocals (5)
- Margaret Branch – backing vocals (6)
- Brenda Corbett – backing vocals (6)
- Aretha Franklin – backing vocals (6)
- Edie Lehmann – backing vocals (7)
- Myrna Matthews – backing vocals (7)
- Marti McCall – backing vocals (7)
- Four Tops – vocals (8):
  - Levi Stubbs – lead vocal
  - Duke Fakir – first tenor vocal
  - Lawrence Payton – second tenor and second lead vocals
  - Renaldo "Obie" Benson – baritone and bass vocals

=== Production ===
- Narada Michael Walden – producer (1, 2, 4, 5), arrangements (1, 2, 4, 5)
- Aretha Franklin – producer (3)
- Arif Mardin – producer (6, 7), arrangements (7)
- Joe Mardin – producer (6), arrangements (6)
- Jerry Knight – producer (8)
- Aaron Zigman – producer (8)
- Peter Max – front and back cover art
- Marlene Cohen – art direction
- Norman Parkinson – photography
- Hand Design – hand lettering
- Richard Sassin – liner notes

Technical credits

- David Frazer – recording (1, 2, 4, 5), mixing (1–5)
- Rod Hui – recording (6), mixing (6)
- Joe Mardin – recording (6), mixing (6)
- Jeremy Smith – recording (7)
- Lew Hahn – remixing (7), additional engineer (7)
- Arif Mardin – remixing (7)
- Gene Paul – remixing (7)
- Darren Klein – engineer (8), mixing (8)
- Lincoln Clapp – additional engineer for Aretha Franklin's vocals (1, 2, 4, 5)
- Dana Jon Chappelle – assistant engineer (1, 2, 4, 5)
- David Glover – additional assistant engineer (1, 2, 4, 5)
- Mike Iacopelli – additional assistant engineer (1, 2, 4, 5) recording (3), vocal recording (6)
- James McGee – assistant engineer (6)
- Steve Scalcione – assistant engineer (6)
- Chris Shaw – assistant engineer (6)
- Matt Tritto – assistant engineer (6)
- Michael O'Reilly – assistant engineer (7)
- Stewart Whitmore – assistant engineer (7)

== Charts ==
=== Weekly charts ===
Weekly chart performance for Through the Storm
Chart (1989)	Peak position
Australian Albums (ARIA)	86
Canada Top Albums/CDs (RPM)	71
European Albums (Music & Media)	62
German Albums (Offizielle Top 100)	61
Italian Albums (Musica e dischi)	12
Norwegian Albums (VG-lista)	11
Swedish Albums (Sverigetopplistan)	17
Swiss Albums (Schweizer Hitparade)	19
UK Albums (Official Charts)	46
US Billboard 200	55
US Top R&B/Hip-Hop Albums (Billboard)	21

=== Year-end charts ===
Year-end chart performance for Through the Storm
Chart (1989)	Position
US Top R&B/Hip-Hop Albums (Billboard)	32
