= Through the Storm (Aretha Franklin and Elton John song) =

1989 single by Aretha Franklin and Elton John

Single by Aretha Franklin and Elton John

from the album Through the Storm
- Released: March 28, 1989
- Genre: R&B
- Length: 4:21
- Label: Arista
- Songwriters: Albert Hammond; Diane Warren
- Producer: Narada Michael Walden

Aretha Franklin singles chronology
"If Ever a Love There Was" (1988)	"Through the Storm" (1989)	"It Isn't, It Wasn't, It Ain't Never Gonna Be" (1989)

Elton John singles chronology
"Mona Lisas and Mad Hatters (Part Two)" (1988)	"Through the Storm" (1989)	"Healing Hands" (1989)

"Through the Storm" is a song by American singer Aretha Franklin and British singer Elton John. The song was written by Albert Hammond, Diane Warren, and produced by Narada Michael Walden. It was released on March 28, 1989, by Arista Records, as the second single from Franklin's album Through the Storm.

== Critical reception ==
Tim Nicholson of Record Mirror left sarcastic review on single saying that this duet "not greatly different from" a previous one between Franklin and George Michael: "″Through the Storm″ is a lumpy dirge, truth be told, and little more than a back-slapping exercise." Edwin Pouncey of New Musical Express in similar style made a suggestion that by this single "Aretha Franklin and Elton John are trying to shrug off the threatening mid-life crisis in their respective careers." Melody Maker's writers echoed their colleagues' general tone, stating in a scathing tone that the material was a repetition of both artists' earlier creative efforts and failed to enhance their credibility. On other hand, Edem E. Ephraim and Dennis Fuller of London Boys, being host reviewers of singles column of Number One on 26 April 1989, selected song as a single of the week. Both gave it highest available ratings and noticed that "they make a good duo voice-wise and everything."

== Charts ==
Chart (1989)	Peak position
Australia (ARIA)	63
Canada Top Singles (RPM)	18
Germany (GfK)	56
Norway (VG-lista)	8
UK Singles (Official Charts)	41
US Billboard Hot 100	16
US Adult Contemporary (Billboard)	3
US Hot R&B/Hip-Hop Songs (Billboard)	17
