= Showtime (James Brown album) =

Studio album by James Brown
- Released: April 1964
- Recorded: March 24, 1964
- Studios: Bell Sound Studios (New York City, New York)
- Genres: Soul; Jazz
- Length: 32:02
- Label: Smash

James Brown chronology
Prisoner of Love (1963)	Showtime (1964)	Grits & Soul (1964)

Singles from Showtime
- 1. "Caldonia / Evil" Released: April 1964; 2. "The Things That I Used to Do" Released: June 1964

Professional ratings
Review scores
Source	Rating
AllMusic	2/5 stars
The Rolling Stone Album Guide	2.5/5 stars

Showtime is the seventh studio album by American musician James Brown. The album was released in April 1964, by Smash Records. It was the transition album from King Records to Smash Records, however, limited by contractual obligations with King, Brown released an album of remakes overdubbed with canned applause. Brown's vocal group, The Famous Flames are included in the album's introduction and are featured on the album's cover but do not appear on any of the tracks. The album was arranged by Sammy Lowe.

== Chart performance ==
The album debuted on Billboard magazine's Top LP's chart in the issue dated May 9, 1964, peaking at No. 61 during an eighteen-week run on the chart.

== Other releases ==
In 1990, several songs from Showtime were released without the overdubbed crowd on the Messing With The Blues and Soul Pride: The Instrumentals 1960-1969 compilation albums.

In mid 2018, some 54 years after its original 1964 release on vinyl, Showtime was released on CD for the first time.

== Track listing ==
No.	Title	Writer(s)	Length
1.	"Introduction of James Brown & The Famous Flames by Danny Ray"		0:13
2.	"Caldonia"	Fleecie Moore	2:44
3.	"Don't Cry Baby"	James Price Johnson, Saul Bernie, Stella Unger	3:06
4.	"Sweet Lorraine"	Cliff Burwell, Mitchell Parish	2:30
5.	"Out of the Blue"	Johnny Terry, Ted Wright	2:19
6.	"Somebody Changed the Lock on My Door"	Casey Bill Weldon	3:52
7.	"Evil"	Ted Wright	2:50
8.	"Blues for My Baby"	Billy Wright, Teddy Reig	3:03
9.	"For You My Love"	Paul Gayten	2:24
10.	"Ain't Nobody Here But Us Chickens"	Alex Kramer, Joan Whitney Kramer	2:59
11.	"The Things That I Used to Do"	J. Dolan	2:56
12.	"You're Nobody 'Til Somebody Love You"	James Cavanaugh, Larry Stock, Russ Morgan	3:00

== Personnel ==
- James Brown – lead vocals, organ ("Evil")
- Maeretha Stewart and others unidentified – background vocals
- Ernie Royal – trumpet
- Dud Bascomb – trumpet
- Johnny Grimes – trumpet
- Richard Harris – trombone
- George Dorsey – alto saxophone
- St. Clair Pinckney – tenor saxophone
- Seldon Powell – tenor saxophone
- Sam “The Man” Taylor or Jerome Richardson – tenor saxophone
- Haywood Henry – baritone saxophone
- Ernie Hayes – piano
- unidentified – strings
- Billy Butler – guitar
- Wally Richardson – guitar
- Al Lucas – bass
- Panama Francis – drums
- Sammy Lowe – conductor, arranger

== Charts ==
Chart (1964)	Peak position
US Billboard Top LP's	61
