= Gimme Your Love =

Single by Aretha Franklin and James Brown

from the album Through the Storm and Soul Session Live
- Released: September 18, 1989
- Genre: R&B, dance-pop
- Length: 5:18 (album version)
- Label: Arista; 9885
- Songwriter(s): Narada Michael Walden; Jeffrey Cohen
- Producer(s): Narada Michael Walden

James Brown charting singles chronology
"Static" (1988)	"Gimme Your Love" (1989)	"(So Tired of Standing Still We Got to) Move On" (1991)

Audio video
- "Gimme Your Love" on YouTube

"Gimme Your Love" is a song recorded as duet between American singers Aretha Franklin and James Brown in 1989. The two singers' only collaboration, it is the lead track on Franklin's album Through the Storm and also appeared on Brown's Soul Session Live. It was written by Narada Michael Walden and Jeffrey Cohen, and produced by the former. It was released as the album's third and final single on September 18, 1989, by Arista Records and peaked at No. 48 on the Billboard R&B singles chart. The song was poorly received by critics, with Rolling Stone describing it as "a series of whoops and grunts as challenging to [the singers] as yawning". Nevertheless, it was nominated for the 1990 Grammy Award for Best R&B Performance by a Duo or Group with Vocal.

== Personnel ==
- Aretha Franklin – lead vocals, vocal engineer
- James Brown – lead vocals
- Kitty Beethoven – backing vocals
- Liz Jackson – backing vocals
- Skyler Jett – backing vocals
- Walter Afanasieff – keyboards, synth bass
- Marc Russo – saxophone solo
- Corrado Rustici – guitar
- Ren Klyce – Fairlight CMI programming
- "Bongo" Bob Smith – drum programming
- Narada Michael Walden – producer, arrangements, Simmons drums
- Lincoln Clapp – engineer
- David Frazer – engineer
