= Cold Sweat (album) =

Studio album by James Brown
- Released: August 1967
- Recorded: March 23 – September 15, 1964 (tracks 6–11); January 25 – May 1967 (remainder of titles)
- Studio: Bell Sound Studios (New York City, New York); Beltone Studios (New York City, New York); RCA Studios (New York City, New York); King Studios (Cincinnati, Ohio)
- Genre: Funk
- Length: 33:43
- Label: King; 1020
- Producer: James Brown

James Brown chronology
James Brown Plays the Real Thing (1967)	Cold Sweat (1967)	I Can't Stand Myself When You Touch Me (1968)

Singles from Cold Sweat
- 1. "I Loves You Porgy" Released: May 1967; 2. "Cold Sweat" Released: June 1967

Professional ratings
Review scores
Source	Rating
AllMusic	4.5/5 stars
The Rolling Stone Album Guide	4/5 stars

Cold Sweat is the seventeenth studio album by American musician James Brown. The album was released in August 1967, by King Records.

== Track listing ==
Side A
No.	Title	Writer(s)	Length
1.	"Cold Sweat, Pt. 1"	James Brown, Alfred Ellis	2:24
2.	"Cold Sweat, Pt. 2"	James Brown, Alfred Ellis	4:46
3.	"Fever"	Eddie Cooley, John Davenport	3:04
4.	"Kansas City"	Jerry Leiber, Mike Stoller	3:22
5.	"Stagger Lee"	Harold Logan, Lloyd Price	2:43
6.	"Good Rockin' Tonight"	Roy Brown	2:25
Total length:			19:20

Side B
No.	Title	Writer(s)	Length
7.	"Mona Lisa"	Jay Livingston, Raymond Evans	1:54
8.	"I Want to Be Around" (featuring New York Studio Orchestra & Chorus)	Johnny Mercer, Sadie Vimmerstedt	2:20
9.	"Nature Boy"	Eden Ahbez	2:38
10.	"Come Rain or Come Shine"	Johnny Mercer, Harold Arlen	2:47
11.	"I Loves You Porgy"	George Gershwin, DuBose Heyward	2:30
12.	"Back Stabbin'"	James Brown, Gene Redd	2:43
Total length:			15:31

Tracks 6–11 were previously released on 1964's Out of Sight.

== Personnel ==
Track 1–5 & 12 (recorded in 1967)

- James Brown – vocals
- Waymon Reed, Joe Dupars, Dud Bascomb, Joe Newman – trumpet
- Richard Harris, Jimmy Cleveland, Garnett Brown – trombone
- Levi Rasbury – valve trombone
- Pee Wee Ellis – alto saxophone
- Maceo Parker, Eldee Williams, Pee Wee Ellis – tenor saxophone
- St. Clair Pinckney – baritone saxophone
- Ernie Hayes – piano
- Jimmy Nolen, Alfonzo Kellum, Wallace Richardson, Carl Lynch – guitar
- Bernard Odum, Al Lucas – bass
- Clyde Stubblefield, Bernard Purdie – drums

Track 6–11 (recorded in 1964)

- James Brown – lead vocals
- Maeretha Stewart, others unidentified – background vocals
- probably: Ernie Royal, Dud Bascomb, Johnny Grimes – trumpet
- Richard Harris – trombone
- George Dorsey – alto saxophone
- St. Clair Pinckney, Seldon Powell, Sam Taylor or Jerome Richardson – tenor saxophone
- Haywood Henry – baritone saxophone
- Ernie Hayes – piano, organ
- unidentified – strings
- Billy Butler, Wallace Richardson – guitars
- Al Lucas – bass
- Panama Francis – drums
