= Try Me! =

Studio album by James Brown and the Famous Flames
- Released: July 1959
- Recorded: February 4, 1956 – January 30, 1959
- Studios: King Studios (Cincinnati, Ohio); Beltone Studios (New York City, New York)
- Genres: Rhythm and blues, soul
- Length: 40:55
- Label: King

James Brown and the Famous Flames chronology
Please Please Please (1958)	Try Me! (1959)	Think! (1960)

Singles from Try Me!
- 1. "I Want You So Bad" Released: February 14, 1959; 2. "I've Got to Change" Released: April 11, 1959; 3. "It Was You" Released: July 19, 1959

Professional ratings
Review scores
Source	Rating
AllMusic	3.5/5 stars
The Rolling Stone Album Guide	2.5/5 stars

Try Me! is the second studio album by James Brown and the Famous Flames. It is a collection of singles, B-sides, and outtakes from their first album, Please Please Please. It was reissued by King Records in 1964 under the title The Unbeatable James Brown: 16 Hits.

== Track listing ==
All tracks composed by James Brown; except where indicated

No.	Title	Writer(s)	Length
1.	"There Must Be a Reason"		2:28
2.	"I Want You So Bad"		2:47
3.	"Why Do You Do Me"	Bobby Byrd, Sylvester Keels	3:01
4.	"Got to Cry"		2:37
5.	"Strange Things Happen"	Roy Hawkins	2:10
6.	"Fine Old Foxy Self"		2:10
7.	"Messing With The Blues"	Floyd Hunt	2:12
8.	"Try Me (I Need You)"		2:33
9.	"It Was You"		2:45
10.	"I've Got to Change"		2:27
11.	"Can't Be The Same"		2:21
12.	"It Hurts to Tell You"	James Brown, Albert Shubert (Andy Gibson)	2:54
13.	"I Won't Plead No More"	Bobby Byrd, Sylvester Keels	2:28
14.	"You're Mine, You're Mine"	James Brown, Nafloyd Scott	2:33
15.	"Gonna Try"		2:46
16.	"Don't Let It Happen To Me"		2:51

== Personnel ==
- James Brown – lead vocals
- Bobby Byrd – backing vocals, piano
- Johnny Terry – backing vocals
- Sylvester Keels – backing vocals
- Nashpendle Knox – backing vocals
- Bill Hollings – backing vocals
- J.W. Archer – backing vocals
- Louis Madison – backing vocals
- John B. Brown – alto saxophone
- George Dorsey – alto saxophone
- Ray Feldor – tenor saxophone
- Cleveland Lowe – tenor saxophone
- Wilbert “Lee Diamond” Smith – tenor saxophone
- Clifford Scott or Hat “Cornbread” Singer – tenor saxophone
- J.C. Davis – tenor saxophone
- Louis Madison – organ, piano
- Alvin "Fats" Gonder – piano
- Ernie Hayes – piano
- Nafloyd Scott – guitar
- Eddie Freeman – guitar
- Kenny Burrell – guitar
- Bobby Roach – guitar
- Clarence Mack – bass
- Edwyn Conley – bass
- Carl Pruitt – bass
- Bernard Odum – bass
- Reginald Hall – drums
- David “Panama” Francis – drums
- Nat Kendrick – drums
