= Let Yourself Go (James Brown song) =

Single by James Brown

from the album Sings Raw Soul
- B-side: "Good Rockin' Tonight"
- Released: April 1967
- Recorded: January 15, 1967, Latin Casino, Cherry Hill, NJ
- Genre: Soul
- Length: 2:45
- Label: King; 6100
- Songwriter(s): James Brown; Bud Hobgood
- Producer(s): James Brown

James Brown charting singles chronology
"Think" (1967)	"Let Yourself Go" (1967)	"Cold Sweat - Part 1" (1967)

Audio video
- "Let Yourself Go" on YouTube

"Let Yourself Go" is a 1967 song by James Brown.

== Release history ==
Brown recorded "Let Yourself Go" after hours in the Latin Casino nightclub during a ten-day performing engagement there. An edited version of this recording was released as a single, which charted #5 R&B and #46 Pop, and appeared on the album Sings Raw Soul. A 3:47-long unedited version of the recording with overdubbed applause was included on Brown's album Live at the Garden, which was itself recorded during the same Latin Casino engagement. The song first appeared in unedited form without overdubs on the 1991 box set Star Time. The 2009 Expanded Edition of Live at the Garden included versions of the song both with and without overdubs, along with an instrumental jam and a false start from the recording session.

== "There Was a Time" ==
Brown and his musicians continued to experiment with the arrangement of "Let Yourself Go" during rehearsals on the road. Eventually a new song, "There Was a Time", developed from the accumulated changes. It was recorded live on stage at the Apollo Theater, where it was the longest part of an extended medley with "Let Yourself Go" and "I Feel All Right". Released in edited form as the B-side of "I Can't Stand Myself (When You Touch Me)", "There Was a Time" charted #3 R&B and #36 Pop. When a version of the full Apollo medley appeared on Brown's 1968 album Live at the Apollo, Volume II, "There Was a Time" was the only song advertised on the album's cover, and it overshadowed its predecessor to the extent that its title became the colloquial name for the entire medley.
