= The Sugarman 3 =

US musical group

- Origin: New York City, New York, United States
- Genres: Funk, R&B
- Years active: 1996–present
- Labels: Desco, Daptone
- Members: Adam Scone, Neal Sugarman, Rudy Albin

The Sugarman 3, sometimes titled The Sugarman Three, is a retro-funk band from New York City formed in 1996 by saxophonist Neal Sugarman, Hammond organ player Adam Scone, and drummer Rudy Albin. The band has released four studio albums—Sugar's Boogaloo (1999), Soul Donkey (2000), Pure Cane Sugar (2002) and What the World Needs Now (2012)—and one compilation album, Sweet Spot (2001).

== History ==
Neal Sugarman grew up in Newton, Massachusetts and played saxophone for punk rock bands Boys Life and Black Cat Bone during the 1980s. He moved to New York in the early 1990s to pursue jazz. After a stint in New Orleans playing with musicians including Eddie Henderson and Mike Longo, Sugarman returned to New York and formed a funk band with organist Adam Scone and drummer Rudy Albin. The trio, named The Sugarman 3, were influenced by artists such as "Brother" Jack McDuff and The Meters. The band was among the musicians who established Desco Records, a label that released reissues of 1960s and 1970s funk and jazz records in addition to material by current acts.

The Sugarman 3's debut album, Sugar's Boogaloo, was released in 1998. Soul Donkey followed in 2000, and included cover versions of songs by James Brown and Lou Donaldson along with original songs by the band. A compilation album, 2001's Sweet Spot, contained selections from the trio's first two albums. In 2002, the band released their third album, Pure Cane Sugar. It featured guest appearances by funk percussionist Bernard Purdie and vocalists Lee Fields and Charles Bradley. Tom Moon of Rolling Stone described the album as "organic, locked-tight music." Maurice Bottomley of PopMatters said, "Play this at your next party and watch your coolest friends unwind and start to Boogaloo. This is the real thing, undiluted and impossible to dislike." Dusted Magazine's Andy Urban said the album "sounds good, but it operates in a vacuum of sorts, music that is pretty, but fundamentally anachronistic and relevant in aesthetic terms only."

Sugarman, who also formed The Dap-Kings with Gabriel Roth, was a session musician during much of the late 2000s, playing on albums by Lily Allen, Amy Winehouse, Robbie Williams, Al Green, Nas, Mark Ronson, as well as the Dap-Kings' own recordings led by vocalist Sharon Jones. "You Don't Know What You Mean (To A Lover Like Me)", a 2004 single by Lee Fields and the Sugarman 3, appeared on the soundtrack to the 2008 comedy-drama film Soul Men.

== Discography ==
=== Studio albums ===
- 1998 - Sugar's Boogaloo (Desco Records)
- 2000 - Soul Donkey (Desco)
- 2002 - Pure Cane Sugar (Daptone Records)
- 2012 - What the World Needs Now (Daptone)

=== Compilation album ===
- 2001 - Sweet Spot (Unique Records)
