= Every Beat of My Heart (Gladys Knight & the Pips song) =

Rhythm and Blues Song from 1952

"Every Beat of My Heart" is a rhythm and blues song written by Johnny Otis. It was first recorded in 1952 by his group, the Royals (later known as the Midnighters).

== The Pips version ==
In 1961, Gladys Knight & the Pips recorded the song as their debut single on the Vee-Jay label. Credited to 'the Pips', it was the first of ten releases by the group to make it to No. 1 on the US Billboard R&B chart. It was also the group's first top ten hit on the Billboard Hot 100. "Every Beat of My Heart" was first recorded for the Huntom label, who later sold the master to Vee-Jay Records. At the time of the song's release, the Pips were on the Fury label where they re-recorded the song without piano. In an unusual occurrence, the Fury recording of the song also made the top twenty on the R&B chart and also made the Hot 100. The track also peaked at number 7 on the New Zealand lever hit parade charts

== James Brown version ==
"Every Beat of My Heart"

Single by James Brown

from the album James Brown and His Famous Flames Tour the U.S.A.
- A-side: "Like a Baby"
- Released: 1963
- Recorded: 1962
- Genre: Rhythm and blues
- Length: 2:56
- Label: King; 5710
- Songwriter: Johnny Otis

James Brown charting singles chronology
"Like a Baby" (1963)	"Every Beat of My Heart" (1963)	"Prisoner of Love" (1963)

Audio video
- "Every Beat Of My Heart" on YouTube

James Brown recorded an instrumental version of "Every Beat of My Heart" with his band which was released as the B-side of his 1963 single "Like a Baby" and charted at No. 99 on the Billboard Hot 100.
