= Money Won't Change You =

1966 single by James Brown

"Money Won't Change You Part 1"

Single by James Brown

from the album Sings Raw Soul
- B-side: "Money Won't Change You Part 2"
- Released: July 1966
- Recorded: June 9, 1966
- Studio: Talent Masters Studios, New York City
- Genre: Soul, funk
- Length: 2:45 (Part 1); 2:19 (Part 2)
- Label: King
- Songwriters: James Brown; Nat Jones
- Producer: James Brown

James Brown charting singles chronology
| "It's a Man's Man's Man's World" (1966) | "Money Won't Change You Part 1" (1966) | "Don't Be a Drop-Out" (1966) |

"Money Won't Change You" is a song recorded by James Brown in 1966. It was released in edited form as a two-part single which charted No. 11 R&B and No. 53 Pop. Both parts of the single were included on Brown's 1967 album Sings Raw Soul.

An unedited version of the song appeared for the first time in the 1991 box set Star Time.

== Background ==
It was his third message song, after "Don't Be a Drop-Out," and "Get it Together", songs recorded in the wake of the Civil Rights Movement.

Billboard described the single as a "soulful wailer in the groove of the past Brown hits." Cash Box said that it is a "pulsating, bluesy, danceable affair about a guy who appears to have serious problems with his gal."

== Cover versions ==
- Aretha Franklin covered "Money Won't Change You" on her 1968 album Lady Soul.

== Popular culture ==
- The song would be remade as "Sexy, Sexy, Sexy" for the film Slaughter's Big Rip-Off.
