= I Got You (I Feel Good) =

1965 single by James Brown

- US vinyl release

Single by James Brown and the Famous Flames

from the album I Got You (I Feel Good)
- B-side: "I Can't Help It (I Just Do-Do-Do)"
- Released: October 1965
- Recorded: May 6, 1965
- Studio: Criteria (Miami, Florida)
- Genre: R&B; soul
- Length: 2:44
- Label: King; 6015
- Songwriter: James Brown
- Producer: James Brown

James Brown and the Famous Flames singles chronology
"Try Me" (1965)	"I Got You (I Feel Good)" (1965)	"Lost Someone" (1966)

Visualizer video
- "James Brown - I Got You (I Feel Good) (Visualizer)" on YouTube

"I Got You (I Feel Good)"
James Brown's "I Got You (I Feel Good)" from the compilation album of the same name

"I Got You (I Feel Good)" is a song by the American singer and songwriter James Brown. First recorded for the 1964 album Out of Sight and then released in an alternate take as a single in 1965 and included on the compilation album of the same name, it was his highest-charting song on the US Billboard Hot 100 and is arguably his best-known recording. In 2013, the 1965 recording was inducted into the Grammy Hall of Fame.

== Description ==
"I Got You (I Feel Good)" is a twelve-bar blues with a brass-heavy instrumental arrangement similar to James Brown's previous hit, "Papa's Got a Brand New Bag". It also features the same emphasis "on the one" (i.e. the first beat of the measure) that characterizes Brown's developing funk style. The lyrics have Brown exulting in how good he feels ("nice, like sugar and spice") now that he has the one he loves, his vocals punctuated by screams and shouts. The song includes an alto sax solo by Maceo Parker.

== Precursors ==
"I Got You (I Feel Good)" developed from an earlier Brown-penned song, "I Found You", with a nearly identical melody and lyrics. "I Found You" had been recorded by Brown's back-up singer Yvonne Fair on January 8, 1962, and released as a single (King 5594) later that year, with little success.

In 1964, Brown recorded an early version of "I Got You (I Feel Good)" with a different arrangement, including a stuttering rhythm and prominent baritone sax line played by Maceo Parker on September 9, 1964, under the title "I Got You". This version appeared on the Smash Records album Out of Sight and in the 1965 film Ski Party, in which Brown and the Famous Flames appear and lip sync a performance of the song, something James Brown would do on various music TV shows shortly before the film's release on June 30, 1965. It was intended for a single release that month (Smash 1989) but was withdrawn due to a court order from King Records, with whom Brown was involved in a contract dispute.

== Recording ==
In 1965, after visiting Criteria Studios in Miami and being impressed by the sound of the studio's custom recording console, King Records owner Syd Nathan booked a recording session for Brown on May 6, during which he recorded the version of "I Got You (I Feel Good)" released by the label as a single.

== Reception ==
The song entered the US Billboard charts on November 13, 1965, following an October release, and reached number three on December 18. Of Brown's 91 hits to reach the Billboard Hot 100, "I Got You (I Feel Good)" is Brown's highest-charting song. The song remained at the top of the Billboard Rhythm and Blues Singles chart for six non-consecutive weeks, after his previous single, "Papa's Got a Brand New Bag", held the number-one spot for eight weeks. Brown's screams at the beginning and end of the song have been sampled a number of times for hip hop and dance songs. The song has also been covered many times by other performers, and is frequently played at sporting events. The song is played at the Zentralstadion whenever RB Leipzig scores a goal.

Cash Box described it as a "rhythmic, funky ode about a real lucky guy who wants nothing more than to be near his gal."

In 2000, "I Got You (I Feel Good)" reached No. 21 on VH1's 100 Greatest Songs in Rock and Roll and No. 75 on VH1's 100 Greatest Dance Songs, one of only seven songs to make both lists. In 2004, "I Got You (I Feel Good)" was ranked No. 78 on Rolling Stone magazine's list of the 500 Greatest Songs of All Time.

== Personnel ==
=== Single version ===
- James Brown – vocals

with the James Brown Orchestra:

- Ron Tooley – trumpet
- Joe Dupars – trumpet
- Levi Rasbury – trumpet
- unidentified – trombone
- Nat Jones – alto saxophone
- St. Clair Pinckney – tenor saxophone
- Eldee Williams – tenor saxophone
- Al "Brisco" Clark – tenor saxophone
- Maceo Parker – tenor saxophone
- Jimmy Nolen – electric guitar
- David "Hooks" Williams – bass guitar
- Melvin Parker – drums

The 1964 recording of the song featured in Out of Sight and Ski Party has the same personnel excluding the trumpet players and including Bobby Byrd on electric organ, Les Buie on electric guitar, Sam Thomas on bass guitar and Maceo Parker playing baritone saxophone.

== Charts ==
Year	Chart	Peak position
1965	UK Singles (OCC)	29
1965	US Billboard Hot 100	3
1965	US Rhythm and Blues Singles (Billboard)	1
1992	Belgium (Ultratop 50 Flanders)	49
1992	UK Singles (OCC)	72
1992	UK Dance (Music Week)	12
1992	UK Club Chart (Music Week)	86

2025 weekly chart performance for "I Got You (I Feel Good)"
Chart (2025)	Peak position
Israel International Airplay (Media Forest)	16

== Certifications ==
James Brown version

Region	Certification	Certified units/sales
Italy (FIMI)	Gold	50,000^{‡}
Spain (Promusicae)	Gold	30,000^{‡}
^{‡} Sales+streaming figures based on certification alone.

Jessie J version

Region	Certification	Certified units/sales
Brazil (Pro-Música Brasil)	Gold	20,000^{‡}
^{‡} Sales+streaming figures based on certification alone.

== Other versions ==
=== Live recordings ===
Brown performs the song on the live albums Live at the Garden (1967), Live at the Apollo, Volume II (1968), Soul Session Live (1989), and Live at the Apollo 1995 (1995).

=== 1975 remake ===
Brown re-recorded the song with the J.B.'s for his 1975 album Sex Machine Today. This version was featured in the 1992 film White Men Can't Jump, and the video games Rock Band 3 (2010) and Don King Presents: Prizefighter (2008).

=== Paul Dakeyne remix ===
In 1992, producer and remixer Paul Dakeyne released a 12" remix of "I Got You (I Feel Good)" on FBI Records under the title "James Brown v. Dakeyne – I Got You (I Feel Good) (The Remixes)". It reached No. 72 on the UK Singles Chart.

== Legacy ==
During the late 1980's through the mid 1990's, the San Francisco Giants used the song in their publicity campaigns.

The song was used in an animation test for the 2001 film Shrek in 1996.

The song is featured in the 2010 video game Just Dance 2.

The song was sampled by American rapper Yung Gravy in the song "Supa Good!!!" (which posthumously credits Brown as a featured artist), for the DreamWorks film, Dog Man. The latter song was also used in a Dick's Sporting Goods advertisement.
