= Cliff White =

British music journalist and critic (1945–2018)

Cliff White (9 November 1945 – 25 January 2018) was a Grammy-winning British music journalist, critic and researcher.

== Biography ==
White became a fan of rock and roll music in his early teens. After leaving school in London, he worked briefly in a stockbrokers' office before securing his first job in the music business in 1964, as a salesman at the HMV record store on Oxford Street. He regularly attended such clubs as the Flamingo, the Marquee and the 100 Club, and for a time sang in a band performing R&B covers, High Society, who toured in Germany. After returning briefly to work at HMV, he worked as a truck driver and for an engineering company before leaving in 1974 to pursue a writing career. He travelled to the US, where he was introduced to James Brown and, as a freelance journalist, started contributing to Black Music and then the New Musical Express.

In the mid and late 1970s White interviewed many of the black musicians touring in Britain and developed friendships with some of them, including James Brown, Screamin' Jay Hawkins, and Johnny "Guitar" Watson. He wrote extensively on black music, interviewing such stars as Michael Jackson, Barry White and Marvin Gaye, and also occasionally reviewed a wider range of records in the NME and other magazines including Smash Hits. He was one of the first to review the Sex Pistols' "Anarchy in the UK", which he described as "lousy... laughably naive... a third-rate Who imitation."

In 1979 he joined Charly Records as press officer, and helped set up the subsidiary Charly R&B record label as well as contributing to archive reissues such as Jerry Lee Lewis' comprehensive box set The Sun Years. In 1989 he joined Demon Records. He left in 1990 to start writing a biography of James Brown, which was never completed, and for several years worked on discographical research for the Mechanical Copyright Protection Society (MCPS). White also continued to write sleeve notes for various soul music compilations, including James Brown's Star Time box set, for which White won a Grammy in 1993. From 2003 to 2008 he worked for the Proper Music distribution company as a label manager.

White lived in Ilford, and died there in 2018, aged 72, from a cardiac arrest while in hospital undergoing tests for cancer.
