= Papa's Got a Brand New Bag =

1965 single by James Brown

"Papa's Got a Brand New Bag Part I"

Single by James Brown and the Famous Flames
- B-side: "Papa's Got a Brand New Bag Part II"
- Released: June 1965
- Recorded: February 1965
- Studio: Arthur Smith Studios (Charlotte, North Carolina)
- Genre: Soul; funk
- Length: 1:55 (Part I); 2:12 (Part II)
- Label: King; 5999
- Songwriter: James Brown
- Producer: James Brown

James Brown charting singles chronology
"Have Mercy Baby" (1964)	"Papa's Got a Brand New Bag Part I" (1965)	"Try Me" (1965)

Music video
- "James Brown - Papa's Got A Brand New Bag (Part 1)" on YouTube

"Papa's Got a Brand New Bag" is a song written and recorded by James Brown. Released as a two-part single in 1965, it was Brown's first song to reach the Billboard Hot 100 Top Ten, peaking at number eight, and was a number-one R&B hit, topping the charts for eight weeks. It won Brown his first Grammy Award, for Best Rhythm & Blues Recording.

Consolidating the rhythmic innovations of earlier James Brown recordings such as "I've Got Money" and "Out of Sight", "Papa's Got a Brand New Bag" is considered seminal in the emergence of funk music as a distinct style. As Brown sings the praises of an old man brave enough to get out on the dance floor of a nightclub ("brand new bag" meaning new interest, taste, or way of doing something), his band provides a horn-heavy backdrop with a prominent rhythm and an electric guitar riff for a hook. Both singer and musicians place overwhelming emphasis on the first beat of each measure ("on the One"). The song is Brown's first recording to feature Jimmy Nolen on guitar.

It's a little beyond me... it's a thing that's just out there. Take any record, even one of my records, and you won't find one that sounds like this. You know what it is? It's the bass don't ever make a change – it stays right there. We were tired when we cut it so we weren't strong enough to make it faster but we wouldn't let the groove drop.

— James Brown, in a July 1965 interview with Alan Leeds, The Singles, Volume III: 1964–1965

The taped recording of "Papa's Got a Brand New Bag" was edited and sped up for its single release, increasing the tempo and raising the pitch by a half step. In 1991, the recording was released in unedited form at its original speed on the box set Star Time. The track includes lead-in studio chatter, with Brown throatily (and presciently) shouting "This is a hit!" just before the drum and horn intro. The song was recorded in just one take.

== Legacy ==
In 2004, "Papa's Got a Brand New Bag" was ranked number 72 on Rolling Stone magazine's list of the 500 greatest songs of all time. (In 2010, the magazine updated its list, and the song was moved up a rank to number 71.)

In 1999, the 1965 recording of "Papa's Got a Brand New Bag (Part 1)" by James Brown on King Records was inducted into the Grammy Hall of Fame.

== Other recordings ==
An instrumental version of "Papa's Got a Brand New Bag" was released as the B-side of Brown's 1965 single from Smash called "Try Me". He also recorded a big band jazz arrangement of the song with Louie Bellson's Orchestra for his 1970 album Soul on Top.

Live performances of "Papa's Got a Brand New Bag" appear on the albums Hot on the One, Live in New York, Soul Session Live, Live at the Apollo 1995, and the 2009 Expanded Edition of Live at the Garden. It is also featured in medleys on Love Power Peace and Say It Live and Loud.

== Cover versions ==
- In 1965, The Fabulous Echoes covered the song on their album Lovin' Feeling.
- In 1965, Buddy Guy played the song participating in the European tour American Folk Blues Festival. The song is not on the record but in the movie that was made of the tour.
- In 1965, The McCoys released a version of the song on their debut album, Hang on Sloopy.
- In 1968, Atco Records released a single by Otis Redding, from the posthumously released LP In Person at the Whisky a Go Go.
- In 1968, The Watts 103rd Street Rhythm Band released a version of the song on their album, Together.
- In 1971, Fadoul, a Moroccan musician, covered the song in Arabic.
- In 1974, The Residents recorded a German version of the song for their Third Reich N Roll album.
- In 1987, Roger Troutman covered the song on his album Unlimited!.
- In 1995, Jimmy Smith recorded an instrumental version on his album Damn!
- In 1999, The Sugarman 3 covered the song on Sugar's Boogaloo.
- In 2006, Bebi Dol covered the song on her album Čovek rado izvan sebe živi.
- In 2007, Ubisoft remake this song for the game Rayman Raving Rabbids 2 covered by Franck Chapelat.
- In 2018, fourteen year-old Courtney Hadwin covered the song in a broadcast performance on NBC's primetime TV show America's Got Talent.

== Personnel ==
- James Brown – lead vocals

with the James Brown Band:

- Joe Dupars – trumpet
- Ron Tooley – trumpet
- Levi Rasbury – trumpet
- Robert [Dick] Knight - trumpet
- unidentified – trombone
- Nat Jones – alto saxophone, organ
- St. Clair Pinckney – tenor saxophone
- Eldee Williams – tenor saxophone
- Al "Brisco" Clark – tenor saxophone
- Maceo Parker – tenor and baritone saxophones
- Jimmy Nolen – guitar
- Sam Thomas – bass
- Melvin Parker – drums

== References and uses in popular culture ==
Pigbag's 1981 single "Papa's Got a Brand New Pigbag" is a play on the title of Brown's original.

"Papa's Got a Brand New Excuse", an episode of The Fresh Prince of Bel Air, was named for the song. The song's title was also referenced by The Simpsons episode "Poppa's Got a Brand New Badge".

The 2013 musical Kinky Boots contains the line "Papa's got a brand new shoe" in the song "Everybody Say Yeah" (music and lyrics by Cyndi Lauper).

Towards the end of one of the mixes of Public Enemy's 1994 song "Give It Up", Flavor Flav is heard to say "Papa's got a brand new bag." The same line is also heard in the rap part of Color Me Badd's 1991 single "Color Me Badd" and Big Daddy Kane's 1989 song "Warm It Up, Kane".

In 1990, the song was featured in an episode of The Wonder Years (season 3, episode 15), "The Tree House". Later it was featured in the 1993 film Mrs. Doubtfire.

A remix of the song was played in the official Season 6 trailer of Call of Duty: Modern Warfare (2019).

Eminem's song "Just Lose It" features the lyric "Papa's got a brand new bag of toys".
