= Three Hearts in a Tangle =

1960 single by Roy Drusky

Single by Roy Drusky

from the album Anymore with Roy Drusky
- B-side: "I'd Rather Loan You Out"
- Released: November 1960
- Recorded: 1960
- Genre: Country
- Length: 2:44
- Label: Decca; 31193
- Songwriters: Sonny Thompson; Ray Starr

Roy Drusky singles chronology
"I Can't Tell My Heart That" (1960)	"Three Hearts in a Tangle" (1960)	"I'd Rather Loan You Out" (1960)

"Three Hearts in a Tangle"

Single by James Brown

from the album Tour the U.S.A.
- B-side: "I've Got Money"
- Released: November 1962
- Genre: Rhythm and blues
- Length: 3:00
- Label: King; 5701
- Songwriters: Ray Pennington; Sonny Thompson

James Brown charting singles chronology
"Mashed Potatoes U.S.A." (1962)	"Three Hearts in a Tangle" (1962)	""I've Got Money" (B-side of "Three Hearts in a Tangle")" (1962)

Audio video
- "Three Hearts In A Tangle" on YouTube

"Three Hearts in a Tangle" is a song written by Ray Pennington and Sonny Thompson. It was first recorded by Pennington under the pseudonym "Ray Starr" for King Records in 1958. Pennington was unsatisfied with the quality of the recording and had it quickly withdrawn. In 1961 Roy Drusky made a hit recording of the song which reached No. 2 on the Country chart and No. 35 on the Billboard Hot 100. A year later, James Brown recorded it in 4/4 time rather than the 3/4 in which it was originally written, earning him a No. 18 R&B hit. Other performers who have recorded the song include Dave Dudley, Leroy Van Dyke, and George and Gwen McCrae.
