= Don't Be a Drop-Out =

1966 single by James Brown

"Don't Be a Dropout"

Single by James Brown

from the album Sings Raw Soul
- B-side: "Tell Me That You Love Me"
- Released: October 1966
- Recorded: August 16, 1966, Arthur Smith Studios, Charlotte, NC
- Genre: Soul
- Length: 3:28
- Label: King; 6056
- Songwriter(s): Burt Jones
- Producer(s): James Brown

James Brown charting singles chronology
"Money Won't Change You Part 1" (1966)	"Don't Be a Dropout" (1966)	"Sweet Little Baby Boy (Part 1)" (1967)

"Don't Be a Dropout" is a song written by Burt Jones and recorded by James Brown. It was Brown's first attempt at a socially conscious song, encouraging teenagers to stay in school. Released as a single in 1966, it charted No. 4 R&B and No. 50 Pop. It also appeared on the album Sings Raw Soul. Bobby Byrd, Vicki Anderson, and The Jewels contribute backing vocals. The song led to Brown meeting with Vice President Hubert Humphrey, who had been working on a stay-in-school program of his own.

An unedited version of the original recording of "Don't Be a Dropout" is included on the 1991 box set Star Time.
