= Maybe the Last Time =

1964 song by James Brown and The Famous Flames

Single by James Brown and The Famous Flames

from the album Out of Sight
- A-side: "Out of Sight"
- Released: July 1964
- Recorded: June 6, 1964, Universal Studios, Chicago, IL
- Genre: R&B, soul
- Length: 2:58
- Label: Smash; 1919
- Songwriter(s): James Brown
- Producer(s): James Brown

Audio video
- "Maybe The Last Time" on YouTube

"Maybe the Last Time" is a song written by James Brown (under the pseudonym Ted Wright) and recorded by Brown and the Famous Flames in 1964. It was released as the B-side of "Out of Sight" and was also included on the Out of Sight album. Brown described it as "a heavy gospel-based number, all about appreciating friends and everything while you can because each time you see somebody may be the last time, you don't know." It was the last studio recording Brown made with the Famous Flames, although the singing group continued to perform live with him for several more years.

"Maybe the Last Time" charted on the Bubbling Under the Hot 100, peaking at No. 7 the week of October 17, 1964. It became a frequent part of Brown and the Famous Flames' concert repertoire in the 1960s. Live performances appear on the albums Live at the Garden, Live at the Apollo, Volume II, and Say It Live and Loud: Live in Dallas 08.26.68, and in the concert film Live at the Boston Garden. The song has gospel antecedents, particularly an earlier recording by the Staple Singers, and similarity to a later track by the Rolling Stones called “The Last Time”, which borrowed its name and theme from the Brown/Famous Flames song.

== Personnel ==
- James Brown - lead vocal, piano

and The Famous Flames:

- Bobby Byrd - vocals
- Bobby Bennett - vocals
- "Baby Lloyd" Stallworth - vocals

with the James Brown Band:

- Mack Johnson - trumpet
- Ron Tooley - trumpet
- Joe Dupars - trumpet
- Robert Knight - trumpet
- Les Buie - guitar
- Bernard Odum - bass
- Melvin Parker - drums
