= Melvin Parker =

American musician (1944–2021)

Melvin Parker

Melvin Parker (June 7, 1944 – December 3, 2021) was an American drummer. He and his brother, saxophonist Maceo Parker, were key members of James Brown's band.

== Life and career ==
Parker was born in Kinston, North Carolina on June 7, 1944. His drumming style was a major ingredient in Brown's funk music innovations in the 1960s. In 1964 and 1965 Parker was the drummer on three of Brown's recordings: "Out of Sight," "Papa's Got A Brand New Bag," and "I Got You (I Feel Good)."

"The greatest drummer I ever had in my life was Melvin Parker," Brown reflected in 2004. "'I Feel Good', 'Papa's Bag' (sic) – nobody ever did that. Nobody. And they can't do it now. And if I was getting ready to cut a record that was right, I would go get Melvin today, because he's just like a metronome."

Parker's first association with Brown ended when he was drafted in the mid-1960s. He was replaced in the band by Clyde Stubblefield and Jabo Starks. Parker rejoined Brown's band in 1969, and appeared on the album Sex Machine.

In 1970, Parker was part of a mutiny by Brown's band. After leaving Brown, Parker joined his brother Maceo's band, Maceo & All the King's Men. He rejoined Brown briefly in 1976, and played on the hit "Get Up Offa That Thing".
