= Out of Sight (song) =

Single by James Brown

from the album Out of Sight
- B-side: "Maybe the Last Time"
- Released: July 1964
- Recorded: May 1964
- Genre: Funk
- Length: 2:23
- Label: Smash; 1919
- Songwriter: Ted Wright
- Producer: Fair Deal Record Corp.

James Brown charting singles chronology
"The Things That I Used to Do" (1964)	"Out of Sight" (1964)	"Have Mercy Baby" (1964)

Audio video
- "Out Of Sight" on YouTube

"Out of Sight" is a funk song recorded by James Brown in 1964 featured on the album of the same name. A twelve-bar blues written by Brown under the pseudonym "Ted Wright", the stuttering, staccato dance rhythms and blasting horn section riffs of its instrumental arrangement were an important evolutionary step in the development of funk music.

== Composition ==
In his 1986 autobiography James Brown: The Godfather of Soul, Brown wrote that

"Out of Sight" was another beginning, musically and professionally. My music - and most music - changed with "Papa's Got a Brand New Bag", but it really started on "Out of Sight" ... You can hear the band and me start to move in a whole other direction rhythmically. The horns, the guitars, the vocals, everything was starting to be used to establish all kinds of rhythms at once... I was trying to get every aspect of the production to contribute to the rhythmic patterns.

"Out of Sight" was the third single Brown recorded for Smash Records in the midst of a contract dispute with his main label, King. A significant pop hit, it reached #24 on the Billboard Hot 100, and #5 on the Cashbox R&B chart. (Billboard had temporarily suspended its R&B listings at the time.) It was also the last song he would record for over a year, as the court's ruling in his dispute with King barred him from making vocal recordings for Smash.

"Out of Sight" was one of Brown's first recordings to feature the playing of saxophonist Maceo Parker. Its B-side, "Maybe the Last Time", was his last studio recording with the Famous Flames. Besides its single release, "Out of Sight" appeared on an album of the same name, which was quickly withdrawn from sale. It was re-released on King in 1968 with one track missing under the title James Brown Sings Out of Sight.

== Reception ==
Bruce Springsteen described the song as, "Pure excitement, pure electricity, pure 'get out of your seat, move your ass'. Pure sweat-filled, gospel-filled raw, rock and roll, rhythm and blues. It's like a taut rubber band."

== Other recordings ==
Performances of "Out of Sight" appear on the 1967 album Live at the Garden and in the 1964 concert film T.A.M.I. Show.

== Cover versions ==
- Van Morrison and Them covered "Out of Sight" on their 1966 album Them Again.
- Billy Vera performed the song on the 1989 album Soul Session Live.
- Johnny Winter covered «Out of Sight» on First Winter album

== Personnel ==
- James Brown - lead vocal

with the James Brown Band:

- McKinley "Mack" Johnson - trumpet
- Ron Tooley - trumpet
- Robert Knight - trumpet
- Joe Dupars - trumpet
- Wilmer Milton - trombone
- Nat Jones - alto saxophone
- Eldee Williams - tenor saxophone
- St. Clair Pinckney - tenor saxophone
- Al "Brisco" Clark - tenor saxophone
- Maceo Parker - baritone saxophone
- Lucas "Fats" Gonder or Bobby Byrd - organ
- Les Buie - guitar
- Bernard Odum - bass
- Melvin Parker - drums
