= I've Got Money =

Single by James Brown

from the album Tour the U.S.A.
- A-side: "Three Hearts in a Tangle"
- Released: November 1962
- Recorded: May 21, 1962, King Studios, Cincinnati, Ohio, United States
- Genre: Rhythm and blues
- Length: 2:30
- Label: King; 5701
- Songwriter: James Brown
- Producer: Unknown

James Brown charting singles chronology
"Three Hearts in a Tangle" (1962)	"I've Got Money" (1962)	"Like a Baby" (1963)

Audio video
- "I've Got Money" on YouTube

"I've Got Money" is a song written and recorded by James Brown. It was released as the B-side of Brown's 1962 R&B hit "Three Hearts in a Tangle". It charted on its own, reaching #93 on the Billboard Hot 100. Both songs appeared on the album Tour the U.S.A..

Biographer R.J. Smith describes "I've Got Money" as "one of the less-known great records of Brown's career":

It's a song whose time has yet to arrive, and it's barely a song. It's like a blueprint of some uncanny object. It's an assemblage of parts: a scimitar guitar chord coming down on the One, a show band horn chorus quoting Judy Garland's "The Trolley Song," and [Clayton Fillyau's] stampeding drums. The parts are arranged in a line, one beside the next - an incomprehensible rebus.

Both Smith and Allmusic's Richie Unterberger point to the song as a stylistic precursor to Brown's later funk recordings.

The Crazy World of Arthur Brown covered "I Got Money" on their 1968 self-titled debut album.

== Personnel ==
- James Brown - lead vocal
- Roscoe Patrick - trumpet
- Teddy Washington - trumpet
- St. Clair Pinckney - tenor saxophone
- Clifford "Ace King" MacMillan - tenor saxophone
- Al "Brisco" Clark - baritone saxophone
- Bobby Byrd - organ
- Les Buie - guitar
- Hubert Perry - bass
- Clayton Fillyau - drums
