= Try Me (James Brown song) =

1958 single by James Brown and The Famous Flames

"Try Me (I Need You)"

Single by James Brown and the Famous Flames

from the album Please Please Please/ Try Me!
- B-side: "Tell Me What I Did Wrong"
- Released: October 1958
- Recorded: September 18, 1958
- Studio: Beltone Studios, New York City
- Genre: Rhythm and blues
- Length: 2:28
- Label: Federal 12337
- Songwriter: James Brown
- Producer: Andy Gibson

James Brown charting singles chronology
"Please, Please, Please" (1956)	"Try Me (I Need You)" (1958)	"I Want You So Bad" (1959)

Audio video
- "Try Me" on YouTube

"Try Me", titled "Try Me (I Need You)" in its original release, is a song recorded by James Brown and the Famous Flames in 1958. It was a #1 R&B hit and charted #48 Pop—the group's first appearance on the Billboard Hot 100. It was Brown and the Flames' second charting single, ending a two-year dry spell after the success of "Please, Please, Please".

== Background ==
By 1958, James Brown's career was faltering. After disputes over royalties, songwriting credit, and the indignity of having been relegated to backup singers on the billing of "Please, Please, Please", most of the original Famous Flames (including founder Bobby Byrd) had walked out on him; only Johnny Terry remained. Brown continued to perform with a backing band and a new Flames lineup consisting of members of Little Richard's former vocal group, the Dominions. ("Big Bill" Hollings, Louis Madison, and J.W. Archer). They recorded more songs for Federal Records, but nine of their singles in a row failed to chart.

On the way back to Macon, Georgia, after a disappointing West Coast tour, Brown approached his guitar player Bobby Roach with a tune he said he had been given by a patron at the Million Dollar Palms, a Florida nightclub. After Roach crafted a guitar part for "Try Me", Brown and the Flames worked out the vocal harmonies together and cut a demo to send to label head Syd Nathan. Nathan was impressed with it and arranged for a recording session in New York City with producer Andy Gibson and a group of seasoned session musicians. Despite the contributions of other people, Brown took sole writing credit for the song.

In his 1986 autobiography, Brown described "Try Me" as "really a pop tune. I had heard 'Raindrops' by Dee Clark and 'For Your Precious Love' by Jerry Butler and the Impressions, so I wrote my song to fit between them."

== Reception ==
Released in October 1958, the song became their first to crack the R&B charts in three years and their first ever to crack the Billboard Hot 100 in December 1958 after their relative failure of "Please, Please, Please" peaking at number 5 on Billboard's Bubbling Under chart (or #105). The song peaked at number one on the R&B chart in February of 1959 and reached number 48 on the Hot 100. It would stay on the Billboard Hot 100 for 13 weeks. The song sold over a million copies and saved the Famous Flames from having their contract dropped due to lack of hits following the original Famous Flames disbanding and Brown's struggles to deal with the group and their performances on the chitlin' circuit. The song was also the best-selling R&B single of 1958.

"Try Me" was included on the albums Please Please Please (King, 1958) and Try Me! (King, 1959).

== Personnel ==
- James Brown - lead vocal

The Famous Flames

- Johnny Terry - background vocals
- Bill Hollings - background vocals
- J.W. Archer - background vocals
- Louis Madison - background vocals

Musicians

- George Dorsey - alto saxophone
- Clifford Scott - tenor saxophone
- Ernie Hayes - piano
- Kenny Burrell - guitar
- Carl Pruitt - bass
- David "Panama" Francis - drums

== Other versions ==
"Try Me"

Single by James Brown

from the album Plays James Brown Today and Yesterday
- B-side: "Papa's Got a Brand New Bag"
- Released: 1965
- Genre: Rhythm and blues
- Length: 3:06
- Label: Smash; 20008
- Songwriter: James Brown
- Producer: James Brown

James Brown charting singles chronology
"Papa's Got a Brand New Bag Part I" (1965)	"Try Me" (1965)	"I Got You (I Feel Good)" (1965)

Brown recorded an instrumental version of "Try Me" for the Smash label in 1965 which charted #34 R&B and #63 Pop in the U.S.

Performances of "Try Me" appear on Live at the Apollo and most of Brown's subsequent live albums. Brown & The Flames recorded a version of "Try Me" with strings for his 1963 album Prisoner of Love.
