= The Amazing James Brown =

The Amazing James Brown And The Famous Flames

Studio album by James Brown and The Famous Flames
- Released: May 1961
- Recorded: September 27, 1960 – February 10, 1961
- Studio: United Studios (Los Angeles, California); King Studios (Cincinnati, Ohio)
- Genre: Rhythm and blues
- Length: 31:34
- Label: King
- Producer: James Brown

James Brown and The Famous Flames chronology
Think! (1960)	The Amazing James Brown And The Famous Flames (1961)	Good, Good, Twistin' (1962)

Singles from The Amazing James Brown
- 1. "The Bells" Released: November 1960; 2. "I Don't Mind" Released: April 1961; 3. "Just You and Me, Darling / I Love You Yes I Do" Released: August 1961; 4. "Lost Someone" Released: November 1961

Professional ratings
Review scores
Source	Rating
The Rolling Stone Album Guide	2.5/5 stars

The Amazing James Brown And The Famous Flames is the fourth studio album by American musician James Brown and The Famous Flames. The album was released in May of 1961, by King Records.

== Track listing ==
All tracks are written by James Brown; except where indicated.

No.	Title	Writer(s)	Length
1.	"Just You and Me, Darling"		2:45
2.	"I Love You Yes I Do"	Henry Glover, Sally Nix, Eddie Seiler, Guy Wood	2:45
3.	"I Don't Mind"		2:43
4.	"Come Over Here"	Brown, Joe Lynn Turner	2:43
5.	"The Bells"	Billy Ward	2:54
6.	"Love Don't Love Nobody"	Roy Brown	2:04
7.	"Dancin' Little Thing"	Hank Ballard	2:17
8.	"Lost Someone"	James Brown, Bobby Byrd, Baby Lloyd Stallworth	3:05
9.	"And I Do Just What I Want"		2:24
10.	"So Long"	Remus Harris, Irving Melsher, Russ Morgan	2:49
11.	"You Don't Have to Go"		2:47
12.	"Tell Me What You're Gonna Do"		2:12

== Personnel ==
- James Brown – lead vocals, piano ("I Don't Mind")
- Bobby Byrd, Baby Lloyd Stallworth, Bobby Bennett or Johnny Terry – backing vocals
- Roscoe Patrick – trumpet
- Alfred Corley – alto saxophone
- J.C. Davis – tenor saxophone
- Louis Madison – organ
- Sonny Thompson or Bobby Byrd – piano
- Les Buie – guitar
- Hubert Lee Perry – bass
- Nat Kendrick – drums
