= George & James =

Studio album by the Residents
- Released: March 1984
- Recorded: October 1983 – February 1984
- Length: 36:24
- Label: Ralph
- Producer: The Residents

The Residents chronology
Whatever Happened to Vileness Fats? (1984)	George & James (1984)	The Big Bubble (1985)

Singles from George & James
- 1. "I'll Go Crazy"/ "It's a Man's Man's Man's World" Released: 1984

Professional ratings
Review scores
Source	Rating
AllMusic	3/5 stars

George & James is the eleventh studio album by the American art rock group the Residents, released in 1984, and subtitled American Composer Series – Volume 1. Side one of the album consists of George Gershwin covers, while side two is a studio rendition of James Brown's 1963 album Live at the Apollo.

The American Composer Series was meant to be an ongoing project, lasting from 1984 until 2000, with the intent to pay homage to different composers and songwriters from the United States. After a second album, Stars and Hank Forever (released in 1986), the project was cancelled following unenthusiastic reviews and high licensing costs, as well as the advent of CD technology, hindering the concept of split albums. The group has mentioned abandoned plans to cover music by Harry Partch, Harry Nilsson, Barry White, Bob Dylan, Sun Ra and Ray Charles, among others.

== Track listing ==
George side
No.	Title	Length
1.	"Rhapsody in Blue"	10:31
2.	"I Got Rhythm"	3:04
3.	"Summertime"	4:08
Total length:		17:43

James side
No.	Title	Length
1.	"Live at the Apollo: I. I'll Go Crazy; II. Try Me; III. Think; IV. I Don't Mind; V. Lost Someone; VI. Please, Please, Please; VII. Night Train"	18:41
Total length:		18:41

=== Bonus track on UK cassette release ===
- "It's a Man's Man's Man's World" – 3:42

== Personnel ==
- The Residents – performance
- Raoul N. Di Seimbote – portrayal of the Famous Flames
