= Good, Good, Twistin' =

Compilation album by James Brown and The Famous Flames
- Released: July 1962
- Recorded: October 21, 1957 – June 9, 1961
- Studio: King Studios (Cincinnati, Ohio); Master Recorders (Los Angeles, California); Beltone Studios (New York City, New York); United Studios (Los Angeles, California); Dukoff Studios (Miami, Florida)
- Genre: Rhythm and blues
- Length: 30:37
- Label: King
- Producer: James Brown

James Brown and The Famous Flames chronology
The Amazing James Brown (1961)	Good, Good, Twistin' (1962)	James Brown and His Famous Flames Tour the U.S.A. (1962)

Singles from Good, Good Twistin'
- 1. "Shout and Shimmy" Released: June 1962; 2. "Have Mercy Baby" Released: November 1964

Good, Good, Twistin' is a compilation album by American musician James Brown and The Famous Flames. It consists of tracks from his first four studio albums, in addition to his recent single "Shout and Shimmy", the previously unreleased "Have Mercy Baby" and a re-recording of "Just Won't Do Right". The album was released in July of 1962 by King Records. The album was later reissued under the title Shout and Shimmy. While some songs feature the original Flames, the longest lasting Flames lineup (Bobby Byrd, Bobby Bennett, and Baby Lloyd Stallworth) are featured on six songs: "I Don't Mind", "Shout and Shimmy", "Good, Good, Lovin'", "Dancin' Little Thing", "Come Over Here" and "You Don't Have To Go".

== Track listing ==
All tracks are written by James Brown; except where indicated.

No.	Title	Writer(s)	Length
1.	"I Don't Mind"		2:46
2.	"Shout and Shimmy"		2:51
3.	"Tell Me What You’re Gonna Do"		2:12
4.	"Good, Good, Lovin'"	James Brown, Albert Shubert	2:19
5.	"Have Mercy Baby"	Billy Ward	2:16
6.	"Begging, Begging"	Julius Dixson, Rudy Toombs	2:42
7.	"Love Don't Love Nobody"	Roy Brown	2:06
8.	"Dancin' Little Thing"	Hank Ballard	2:20
9.	"Come Over Here"	James Brown, Joe Lynn Turner	2:45
10.	"You Don't Have to Go"		2:49
11.	"Just Won't Do Right (I Stay in the Chapel Every Night)"		2:43
12.	"It Was You"		2:45
