= The James Brown Show =

Live album by James Brown and various artists
- Released: January 1967
- Recorded: April 24, 1966 (live portions)
- Genre: Rhythm and blues, soul
- Label: Smash
- Producer: James Brown

James Brown live albums chronology
Pure Dynamite! Live at the Royal (1964)	The James Brown Show (1967)	Live at the Garden (1967)

The James Brown Show (also known as Presenting the James Brown Show) is a 1967 album featuring James Brown. It was released on Smash Records and showcases the vocalists who performed with the James Brown Revue in the mid-1960s, including Famous Flame "Baby Lloyd" Stallworth, Vicki Anderson, The Jewels, and James Crawford. Following the terms of Brown's contract with King Records, he does not sing on the album, but contributes as producer, arranger, and organist.

Although The James Brown Show presents itself as a live album, parts of it were recorded in the studio. It has never been released on CD.

== Track listing ==
Side A
No.	Title	Writer(s)	Performer	Length
1.	"(I Can't Get No) Satisfaction"	Mick Jagger, Keith Richards	Baby Lloyd	2:40
2.	"The Dog"	Rufus Thomas	Baby Lloyd	2:14
3.	"Don't Mess with Bill"	Smokey Robinson	Vicki Anderson	3:20
4.	"Nowhere to Run"	Holland-Dozier-Holland	Vicki Anderson	2:20
5.	"This Is My Story"	James Brown	The Jewels	3:27
6.	"Something's Got a Hold on Me"	Etta James, Leroy Kirkland, Pearl Woods	The Jewels	4:35

Side B
No.	Title	Writer(s)	Performer	Length
1.	"Wait Till the Midnight Hour"		James Crawford	2:29
2.	"Stop and Think It Over"	Nat Jones	James Crawford	2:45
3.	"634-5789"	Eddie Floyd, Steve Cropper	James Crawford	3:17
4.	"Strung Out"	Ted Wright, Bobby Byrd	James Crawford	3:04
5.	"(I Can't Get No) Satisfaction"	Mick Jagger, Keith Richards	James Brown Orchestra	3:08
