= Oh Baby Don't You Weep =

"Oh Baby Don't You Weep (Part 1)"

Single by James Brown and The Famous Flames

from the album Pure Dynamite! Live at the Royal
- B-side: "Oh Baby Don't You Weep (Part 2)"
- Released: 1964 (US)
- Genre: Rhythm and blues, soul
- Length: 2:58 (Part 1); 2:59 (Part 2)
- Label: King; 5842
- Songwriter: James Brown

James Brown charting singles chronology
"Signed, Sealed, and Delivered" (1963)	"Oh Baby Don't You Weep (Part 1)" (1964)	"Please, Please, Please" (1964)

Audio video
- "Oh, Baby, Don't You Weep" on YouTube

"Oh Baby Don't You Weep" is a song recorded in 1964 by James Brown and The Famous Flames. Based upon the spiritual "Mary Don't You Weep", it was recorded as an extended-length track and released as the first two-part single of Brown's recording career. It peaked at #23 on the Billboard Hot 100 and at #4 on the Cash Box R&B Chart. (At the time of the single's release, Billboard's R&B singles chart had been temporarily suspended). It was the last original song featuring the Famous Flames to chart, not counting the 1964 re-release of "Please, Please, Please" and the 1966 B-side release of the Live at the Apollo performance of "I'll Go Crazy".

"Oh Baby, Don't You Weep" was originally issued with dubbed-in audience noise to simulate a live recording and added to the otherwise authentic live album Pure Dynamite: Live At The Royal. The song's last-minute addition to the album helped make it a hit, propelling it to #10 on the Billboard Pop Album chart.

Brown plays the role of the song's narrator, a man comforting a woman devastated by lost love:

You scream and you holler,
your back is soaking wet,
You know that you still love him
and still you can't forget

The Famous Flames support Brown's lead vocal with gospel-inspired chants of "Oh baby, don't you weep". During the course of the song, the theme suddenly changes, as Brown sings of famous entertainers he has met in his travels ("I've got a lot of friends in my business"), and then begins to quote titles of songs recorded by them, such as Jackie Wilson ("You Better Stop Dogging Me Around"), Solomon Burke and Wilson Pickett ("If You Need Me....Call Me" and "It's Too Late"), Sam Cooke ("You Send Me") Ray Charles ("Born To Lose") and Famous Flames member Bobby Byrd's solo release ("I Found Out Now").

"Oh Baby Don't You Weep" was the last new recording Brown made for King Records for over a year. An incident during the recording session in which producer Gene Redd criticized Brown's piano playing as "musically incorrect" brought to a head his disagreements with label owner Syd Nathan and his staff. In response, Brown and Famous Flame Bobby Byrd formed a production company, Fair Deal Record Corporation, and accepted an offer from Mercury Records to release new recordings on their Smash subsidiary. With Brown gone, Nathan resorted to releasing rejected songs and outtakes from earlier recording sessions in the ensuing months. Eventually King's lawyers took the dispute to court and obtained a ruling preventing Brown from issuing his vocal recordings on other labels. In mid-1965 Brown returned to King to release the hit "Papa's Got a Brand New Bag". He continued to record instrumentals and produce records for other performers on Smash through 1967.

Despite its hit status, "Oh Baby Don't You Weep" has rarely been heard on radio or reissued since its original 1964 release. It appears on the Roots of a Revolution compilation album and CD in its originally recorded version without the dubbed-in crowd noise, and on the 2007 Hip-O Select release James Brown: The Singles Vol. 2. It inspired a cover version by Eddie Money.

== Personnel ==
James Brown & The Famous Flames :

- James Brown - lead vocal, piano
- Bobby Byrd - backing vocals
- Bobby Bennett - backing vocals
- "Baby Lloyd" Stallworth – backing vocals
- The James Brown Band - instrumentation
- Sam Lathan, drums
