= Pure Dynamite! Live at the Royal =

Live album by James Brown and The Famous Flames
- Released: January 1964
- Recorded: November 15, 1963
- Venues: Royal Theatre, Baltimore, Maryland
- Genres: R&B, soul
- Labels: King; K883
- Producers: James Brown, Gene Redd, Syd Nathan

James Brown live albums chronology
Live at the Apollo (1963)	Pure Dynamite! Live at the Royal (1964)	The James Brown Show (1967)

Singles from Pure Dynamite! Live at the Royal
- 1. "Oh Baby Don't You Weep" Released: January 1964; 2. "Please, Please, Please" Released: February 1964

Professional ratings
Review scores
Source	Rating
Allmusic	4.5/5 stars

Pure Dynamite! Live At The Royal is a 1964 live album by James Brown and The Famous Flames. Originally issued on King Records, it was the live follow-up to Brown's 1963 Live at the Apollo LP, and like that album, reached the Top 10 of the Billboard Pop album charts, peaking at #10. It was recorded live at the Royal Theatre in Baltimore, Maryland, a popular venue for R&B artists of the day. The album takes its title from Brown's most famous nickname at the time, "Mr. Dynamite".

== Overview ==
Although most of Pure Dynamite! is live, it contains two non-live studio tracks, "Like A Baby" and the extended-length song "Oh Baby, Don't You Weep", which was the group's then-current hit release. Dubbed-in crowd noise was added to simulate a live recording.

Pure Dynamite! features live versions of the singles Brown & The Flames had released since the Apollo LP. It opens with "Shout and Shimmy" (Billboard Pop #61, R&B #16) which features a comedy skit between James and Famous Flames member Bobby Bennett, and continues with the standard "These Foolish Things", (which was a charting single for the group the previous year; Billboard Pop #55, R&B #25), "Like a Baby", another charting standard (#24 R&B, also from '63), and "Signed, Sealed, And Delivered" (not to be confused with the similarly-titled song by Stevie Wonder; #77 Pop), also from '63. Side 1 closes with "I'll Never Never Let You Go", another song from the group's 1960 Think! LP. Side two features Brown's signature hit, the million-selling "Please, Please, Please", the aforementioned "Oh Baby Don't You Weep" (#23 Pop), and closes with the group's 1959 regional hit single "Good Good Lovin'".

The Famous Flames (Bobby Byrd, Bobby Bennett, and Lloyd Stallworth) play an important co-starring role on Pure Dynamite!. Although they did not receive billing on the album's label or cover, this is one of the few James Brown albums where the Flames can actually be seen in the cover photograph. But the photo is misleading: only two of the Flames are visible, partially obscured, and it was clearly taken at the Apollo Theater in New York City, not at the Royal. The Flames are pictured with Brown on the original album insert's liner notes, and are included with Brown in the album's intro.

== Reissues ==
Pure Dynamite! has been reissued on CD by Polydor at least twice, but mostly for markets outside the United States.

== Track listing ==
Side 1
No.	Title	Length
1.	"Shout & Shimmy"	1:34
2.	"I'm Tired But I'm Clean" (with Famous Flame Bobby Bennett)"	2:11
3.	"These Foolish Things"	2:48
4.	"Signed Sealed & Delivered"	2:58
5.	"Like A Baby"	2:49

Side 2
No.	Title	Length
1.	"I'll Never Let You Go"	2:15
2.	"Please, Please, Please"	3:56
3.	"Oh Baby Don't You Weep"	6:55
4.	"Good Good Lovin'"	2:38

== Personnel ==
- James Brown – lead vocals, organ

& The Famous Flames

- Bobby Byrd – baritone/bass
- Bobby Bennett – first tenor
- Baby Lloyd Stallworth – second tenor

with:

- The James Brown Band – music
- Tammy Montgomery, Yvonne Fair – backing vocals
- Melvin Parker – drums
- Sam Lathan, drums

Technical

- Chuck Seitz, Ron Lenhoff – audio recording
- Hal Neely – audio recording, album design
- Chuck Stewart – photography

== Charts ==
Chart (1964)	Peak position
US Billboard Top LPs	10
