= Night Train (Jimmy Forrest composition) =

1951 blues record

- Original single label

Single by Jimmy Forrest
- B-side: "Bolo Blues"
- Released: March 1, 1952
- Recorded: November 27, 1951
- Genre: Rhythm and blues
- Length: 2:50
- Label: United (110)
- Songwriters: Oscar Washington; Lewis P. Simpkins; Jimmy Forrest

Audio video
- "Night Train" on YouTube

"Night Train" is a twelve-bar blues instrumental standard first recorded by Jimmy Forrest in 1951.

== Origins and development ==
"Night Train" has a long and complicated history. The piece's opening riff was first recorded in 1940 by a small group led by Duke Ellington sideman Johnny Hodges, under the title "That's the Blues, Old Man".

Ellington used the same riff as the opening and closing theme of a longer-form composition, "Happy-Go-Lucky Local", that was itself one of four parts of his 1946 Deep South Suite. Jimmy Forrest was part of Ellington's band when it performed this composition, which has a long tenor saxophone break in the middle. After leaving Ellington, Forrest recorded "Night Train" on United Records, and his record was the fifth best selling R&B record of 1952. While "Night Train" employs the same riff as the earlier recordings, Forrest's record used a rhythm and blues arrangement, and included a stop-time tenor sax break not used in the Hodges or Ellington arrangements.

== Solo importance ==
Forrest's saxophone solo on the 1951 "Night Train" recording became a part of the performance tradition of the song, and is usually recreated in cover versions by other performers. Trombonist Buddy Morrow, for example, played Forrest's solo on trombone on a 1953 recording of the song that became a hit in Great Britain and reached No.12 on the UK singles chart.

Broadcast Music, Inc. (BMI) credits the composition to Jimmy Forrest and Oscar Washington.

== Lyrics ==
Several different sets of lyrics have been set to the tune of "Night Train". The earliest, written in 1952, are credited to Lewis P. Simpkins, the co-owner of United Records, and guitarist Oscar Washington. They are a typical blues lament by man who regrets treating his woman badly now that she has left him. Douglas Wolk, who describes the original lyrics as "fairly awful", suggests that Simpkins co-wrote (or had Washington write) them as a deliberate throwaway, in order to get part of the tune's songwriting credit; this entitled him to substantial share of "Night Train"'s royalties, even though it was most often performed as an instrumental without the lyrics.

Eddie Jefferson recorded a version of "Night Train" with more optimistic lyrics, about a woman returning to her man on the night train.

== James Brown version ==
"Night Train"
- 1964 UK re-release label

Single by James Brown

from the album James Brown Presents His Band
- B-side: "Why Does Everything Happen to Me"
- Released: March 1962
- Recorded: February 9, 1961
- Studio: King, Cincinnati, Ohio
- Genre: Rhythm and blues
- Length: 3:35
- Label: King (5614)
- Songwriters: Oscar Washington; Lewis P. Simpkins; Jimmy Forrest

James Brown singles chronology
"Lost Someone" (1961)	"Night Train" (1962)	"Shout and Shimmy" (1962)

Audio video
- "Night Train" on YouTube

James Brown recorded "Night Train" with his band the Famous Flames in 1961. His performance replaced the original lyrics of the song with a shouted list of cities on his East Coast touring itinerary (and hosts to black radio stations he hoped would play his music) along with many repetitions of the song's name. (Brown would repeat this lyrical formula on "Mashed Potatoes U.S.A." and several other recordings.) James Brown himself plays drums on this recording; supposedly the reason for this is that during the recording session Nat Kendrick, the originally planned drummer for the track, took a bathroom break so Brown took his place and that take was used for the single. However this is somewhat disputed as during the session tapes Brown plays the drums on all four takes of the song. Originally appearing as a track on the album James Brown Presents His Band and Five Other Great Artists, it received a single release in 1962 and became a hit, charting #5 R&B and #35 Pop.

A live version of the tune was the closing number on Brown's 1963 album Live at the Apollo. Brown also performs "Night Train" along with his singing group the Famous Flames (Bobby Byrd, Bobby Bennett, and Lloyd Stallworth) on the 1964 motion picture/concert film The T.A.M.I. Show.

Brown's backing band the J.B.'s would later incorporate the main saxophone line of "Night Train" in their instrumental single, "All Aboard The Soul Funky Train", released on the 1975 album Hustle with Speed.

== Other versions ==
- Buddy Morrow – 1953
- Louis Prima – The Wildest!, 1956.
- Earl Bostic – Bostic Rocks: Hits of the Swing Age, 1958
- Art Mooney and His Orchestra – 1958
- The Ames Brothers – The Blend and the Beat, 1960
- Oscar Peterson – Night Train, 1963
- James Brown – Live at the Apollo, 1963
- Georgie Fame – Rhythm and Blues at the Flamingo, 1964
- Bill Doggett – Back Again With More Bill Doggett, 1964
- Maynard Ferguson – The Blues Roar, 1964
- Paul Revere & the Raiders - 1966 on the Just Like Us! album
- Vassar Clements – Vassar Clements, 1975
- Eddie Jefferson with Hamiet Bluiett – The Main Man, 1977
- Marvin Berry & The Starlighters – Back to the Future: Music from the Motion Picture Soundtrack, 1985
- Dirty Dozen Brass Band – Live: Mardi Gras in Montreux, 1986
- World Saxophone Quartet – Rhythm and Blues, 1989
- Christian McBride – Gettin' to It, 1994, For Jimmy, Wes and Oliver, 2020

== See also ==
- List of train songs
