= I Love You Yes I Do =

Single by Bull Moose Jackson

Single by Bull Moose Jackson and his Buffalo Bearcats
- B-side: "Sneaky Pete"
- Released: 1947
- Genre: Rhythm and blues
- Label: King; 4181
- Songwriter(s): Sally Nix; Henry Glover

"I Love You Yes I Do"

Single by Bull Moose Jackson
- B-side: "Aw Shucks Baby"
- Released: 1961
- Genre: Rhythm and blues
- Length: 3:33
- Label: 7 Arts; 705
- Songwriter(s): Sally Nix; Henry Glover

"I Love You, Yes I Do"

Single by James Brown

from the album The Amazing James Brown
- B-side: "Just You and Me, Darling"
- Released: 1961
- Genre: Rhythm and blues
- Length: 2:46
- Label: King; 5547
- Songwriter(s): Guy Wood; Edward Seiler; Sol Marcus; Sally Nix; Henry Glover

James Brown charting singles chronology
"Baby, You're Right" (1961)	"I Love You, Yes I Do" (1961)	"Lost Someone" (1961)

"I Love You Yes I Do" is an October 1947 single by Bull Moose Jackson and his Buffalo Bearcats. The song was written by Henry Glover and Sally Nix. The single was Jackson's first number one on the US Billboard R&B chart, spending three weeks at the top spot and peaking at number 24 on the pop chart.

== 1961 recording ==
In 1961, Bull Moose Jackson recorded a new version of the song without his band. The new version hit number ten on the R&B chart, and number 98 on the Billboard Hot 100. Both versions of "I Love You Yes I Do" were the only times Jackson crossed over to the national pop chart.

== Cover versions ==
James Brown recorded a cover version of the song in 1961 which failed to chart, though its B-side, "Just You and Me, Darling", charted number 17 on the R&B chart. He also performed the song in a medley with The Famous Flames on the 1963 album, Live at the Apollo.
