= Papa's Got a Brand New Bag (album) =

Compilation album by James Brown
- Released: August 1965
- Recorded: November 11, 1959 – February 1965
- Studio: King (Cincinnati, Ohio); United (Los Angeles, California); Dukoff (Miami, Florida); Arthur Smith (Charlotte, North Carolina)
- Genre: R&B
- Length: 29:19
- Label: King; 938
- Producer: James Brown

James Brown chronology
Out of Sight (1964)	Papa's Got a Brand New Bag (1965)	James Brown Plays James Brown Today & Yesterday (1965)

Singles from Papa's Got a Brand New Bag
- 1. "Have Mercy Baby" Released: November 1964; 2. "This Old Heart" Released: February 1965; 3. "Papa's Got a Brand New Bag" Released: June 1966

Papa's Got a Brand New Bag is a compilation album by American musician James Brown. It consists of songs taken from albums throughout his career with King Records. Also included are "Papa's Got a Brand New Bag" (previously released as a single) and "Have Mercy Baby" (first released on the compilation Good, Good, Twistin' and later as a single). The album was released in 1965, by King.

== Chart performance ==
The album debuted on Billboard magazine's Top LP's chart in the issue dated September 11, 1965, peaking at No. 26 during a twenty-seven week run on the chart.

== Track listing ==
All tracks are written by James Brown; except where indicated.

No.	Title	Writer(s)	Length
1.	"Papa's Got a Brand New Bag (Pt. 1)"		2:08
2.	"Papa's Got a Brand New Bag (Pt. 2)"		2:11
3.	"Mashed Potatoes U.S.A."		2:47
4.	"Cross Firing"		2:28
5.	"Love Don't Love Nobody"	Roy Brown	2:08
6.	"I Stay in the Chapel Every Night"		2:45
7.	"And I Do Just What I Want"		2:29
8.	"This Old Heart"		2:21
9.	"Baby, You're Right"	Joe Tex, James Brown	3:10
10.	"Have Mercy Baby"	Billy Ward	2:16
11.	"You Don't Have To Go"		2:49
12.	"Doin' the Limbo"		2:31

== Charts ==
Chart (1965)	Peak position
US Billboard Top LPs	26
