= Shout and Shimmy =

R&B song by James Brown

Single by James Brown and The Famous Flames

from the album Shout and Shimmy
- B-side: "Come Over Here"
- Released: June 1962
- Recorded: King Studios, Cincinnati
- Genre: Rhythm and blues, soul
- Length: 3:00
- Label: King
- Songwriter: James Brown

James Brown charting singles chronology
| "Night Train" (1962) | "Shout and Shimmy" (1962) | "Mashed Potatoes U.S.A." (1962) |

Audio video
- "Shout And Shimmy" on YouTube

"Shout and Shimmy" is an R&B song written by James Brown, and recorded by him and The Famous Flames. It rose to No. 16 on the R&B chart and No. 61 on the Billboard Hot 100.

== Background ==
Critic Douglas Wolk described the song as "a truly shameless ripoff of The Isley Brothers' 1959 hit "Shout"... basically the fast parts of "Shout" with the gospel inflections removed and the word 'shimmy' added." Wolk argues that Brown and The Famous Flames probably performed "Shout and Shimmy" during the October 24, 1962, concerts where Live at the Apollo was recorded, but that it was omitted from the album to avoid sales competition with the studio version. Evidence to support this contention includes the fact that Brown customarily began his concerts with his latest hit (which "Shout and Shimmy" was at the time) and the presence of "Shout and Shimmy"'s a cappella opening ("You know I feel all right...") immediately before the first song on the album, "I'll Go Crazy". James and The Famous Flames performed this song on Dick Clark's American Bandstand, during a June 11, 1962 telecast . A performance of "Shout and Shimmy" was the first track on Brown & The Flames' next live album, 1964's Pure Dynamite! Live at the Royal, featuring a comedy skit between Brown and Famous Flame Bobby Bennett.

== The Who version ==
"Shout and Shimmy"

Single by the Who
- A-side: "My Generation"
- Released: October 29, 1965
- Recorded: April 12–14, 1965
- Studio: IBC Studios, London
- Genre: Rhythm and blues, beat
- Length: 3:20
- Label: Brunswick
- Songwriter: James Brown
- Producer: Shel Talmy

The Who UK singles chronology
| "Anyway, Anyhow, Anywhere" (1965) | "My Generation" / "Shout and Shimmy" (1965) | "Substitute" (1966) |

In two days during 12 to 14 April 1965, British rock group the Who recorded "Shout and Shimmy" as the B-side to their fourth single (third single under the name 'the Who') "My Generation", which was released on October 29, 1965. The A-side reached number 2 in the United Kingdom, but only reached number 74 on the Billboard Hot 100 and number 99 in Cashbox magazine. The song was part of the Who's repertoire from late 1964, along with several other rhythm and blues covers, including other songs by James Brown. It was ultimately dropped in 1966 once the group had written enough original material. Several other songs were recorded during the same session as "Shout and Shimmy", including "I'm a Man", "Leaving Here", "Anyway, Anyhow, Anywhere" and two other songs written by Brown: "Please, Please, Please" and "I Don't Mind".

Their version is undisputedly greatly derived from "Shout", a song by the Isley Brothers made famous by Lulu and the Luvvers, including call- and-response lyrics throughout, similar to other songs by the group at the time, including "Anyway, Anyhow, Anywhere". In the US however, "Shout and Shimmy" was not released as the B-side of "My Generation", and was instead substituted by "Out in the Street", which later appeared on their debut album My Generation. On this release the song is dubbed "Out in the Street (You're Going to Know Me)". "Shout and Shimmy" became a rare collectible in the US, since it wasn't included on the equivalent version of My Generation released in America, The Who Sings My Generation, and instead would remain unissued until it was belatedly released as the opening song to Who's Missing, a collection of rare tracks by the Who was released in 1985.

An archival live performance was eventually released in the 1979 film The Kids Are Alright, but it was not included in the soundtrack album for that movie. It has since been included on reissues and remasters of the album My Generation. Ultimate Classic Rock ranked it 130 on their list of All 245 Who Songs Ranked Worst to Best in 2018, stating "A party record that captures an element of how frenetic these James Brown covers must have sounded at early Who gigs. A whole mess of fun.
