= Signed Sealed and Delivered (song) =

1948 single by Cowboy Copas

Single by Cowboy Copas
- B-side: "Opportunity Is Knocking at Your Door"
- Released: June 1, 1963
- Genre: Country
- Length: 2:37
- Label: King; 658
- Songwriters: Cowboy Copas; Lois Mann

"Signed, Sealed, and Delivered"

Single by James Brown and The Famous Flames

from the album Prisoner of Love
- B-side: "Waiting in Vain"
- Released: September 1963
- Genre: Rhythm and blues
- Length: 2:45
- Label: King; 5803
- Songwriters: Cowboy Copas; Lois Mann

James Brown charting singles chronology
"These Foolish Things" (1963)	"Signed, Sealed, and Delivered" (1963)	"Oh Baby Don't You Weep (Part 1)" (1964)

Audio video
- "Signed, Sealed And Delivered" on YouTube

"Signed Sealed and Delivered" is a song by Cowboy Copas (co-credited to Lois Mann). Copas recorded a hit version for King Records, which reached number two on the Most Played Juke Box Folk Records chart in 1948. Copas re-recorded the song in 1961 for Starday Records, in Stereophonic Sound, and with a more modern (for the times) style. This version also charted, reaching number 10 on the Hot C&W Sides chart.

== Cover versions ==
- In 1961, Rusty Draper recorded a version that peaked at number 20 on the Easy Listening chart, number 91 on the Hot 100, and number 8 in Canada.
- In 1963, James Brown and the Famous Flames recorded an R&B cover version, which charted at number 77 on the Pop chart. Brown and the Famous Flames also performed the song on the 1964 live album Pure Dynamite! Live at the Royal.
- Other performers who covered the song include Hank Thompson, Hank Locklin, and Lefty Frizzell.
