= I Know You Got Soul =

I Know You Got Soul may refer to:

- "I Know You Got Soul" (Bobby Byrd song), a 1971 song recorded by Bobby Byrd
- "I Know You Got Soul" (Eric B. & Rakim song), a 1987 song by Eric B. & Rakim that samples the Bobby Byrd song
- I Know You Got Soul (book), a 2004 nonfiction book by Jeremy Clarkson
