= Just Won't Do Right =

1957 single by James Brown and the Famous Flames

Single by James Brown and the Famous Flames

from the album Please Please Please
- B-side: "Let's Make It"
- Released: January 5, 1957
- Recorded: July 24, 1956
- Studio: King (Cincinnati, Ohio)
- Genre: Rhythm and blues
- Length: 2:31
- Label: Federal; 1217
- Songwriter: James Brown

James Brown and the Famous Flames singles chronology
"Chonnie-On-Chon" (1956)	"Just Won't Do Right" (1957)	"Gonna Try" (1957)

Audio video
- "Just Won't Do Right" on YouTube

"Just Won't Do Right" is a rhythm and blues song performed by James Brown and the Famous Flames and released as a single by King Records on January 5, 1957. Written by James Brown and recorded as a duet with Bobby Byrd on July 24, 1956, the song was also featured on the Please, Please, Please album. "Just Won't Do Right" was the first song released with James Brown as the sole songwriter and one of the most frequently re-recorded over his career.

== Personnel ==
- James Brown – lead vocals
- Bobby Byrd – co-vocals
- Wilbert "Lee Diamond" Smith, Ray Felder – tenor saxophone
- Lucas "Fats" Gonder – piano
- Nafloyd Scott – electric guitar
- Clarence Mack – bass guitar
- Reginald Hall – drums

== Just Won't Do Right (I Stay in the Chapel Every Night) ==
"Just Won't Do Right (I Stay in the Chapel Every Night)"

Single by James Brown

from the album Good, Good, Twistin'
- A-side: "Have Mercy Baby"
- Released: November 1964
- Recorded: June 9, 1961
- Studio: Dukoff (Miami, Florida)
- Genre: Rhythm and blues
- Length: 2:40
- Label: King; 5968
- Songwriter: James Brown
- Producer: James Brown

James Brown singles chronology
"Out of Sight" (1964)	"Just Won't Do Right (I Stay in the Chapel Every Night)" (1964)	"Papa's Got a Brand New Bag" (1965)

Audio video
- "Just Won't Do Right (I Stay in the Chapel Every Night)" on YouTube

"Just Won't Do Right (I Stay in the Chapel Every Night)", sometimes issued as "I Stay in the Chapel Every Night", is a re-recording of "Just Won't Do Right" performed by James Brown and released by King Records in July 1962 as part of the Good, Good Twistin' album. The song was also featured as the B-side of "Have Mercy Baby" issued in November 1964. This version of "Just Won't Do Right" was recorded on June 9, 1961 and features new lyrics with Brown and Byrd singing "I stay in the chapel every night" in place of "I drink and gamble every night".

=== Personnel ===
- James Brown – lead vocals
- Bobby Byrd – backing vocals
- Roosevelt Brown – trumpet
- St. Clair Pinckney – tenor saxophone
- Al "Brisco" Clark – baritone saxophone
- Lucas "Fats" Gonder – electric organ
- Les Buie – electric guitar
- Hubert Lee Perry – bass guitar
- Nat Kendrick – drums

== Lyn Collins version ==
"Just Won't Do Right"

Single by Lyn Collins

from the album Think (About It)
- A-side: "Wheels Of Life"
- Released: December 1971
- Recorded: December 9, 1968 – February 15, 1971
- Studio: King (Cincinnati, Ohio); Bobby Smith (Macon, Georgia)
- Genre: Rhythm and blues
- Length: 2:59
- Label: Polydor; 14107
- Songwriter: James Brown
- Producer: James Brown

Lyn Collins singles chronology
"Just Won't Do Right" (1971)	"Think (About It)" (1972)

Audio video
- "Just Won't Do Right" on YouTube

"Just Won't Do Right" is a cover of the 1957 song of the same name performed by Lyn Collins and released as the B-side to Lyn Collins' first single, "Wheels Of Life", on December 1971 by Polydor Records. The song was recorded as a duet with James Brown over a version of the song from December 9, 1968 arranged by Pee Wee Ellis for Marva Whitney that was never released. This Lyn Collins version features another lyric change to the line "I stay at the chapel every night", this time sung as "I cry at the chapel every night". The record was originally intended to be issued under James Brown's People Records but was rescheduled for release under King, promo copies were pressed for King but this too fell through and the song was ultimately officially released on Polydor.

=== Personnel ===
- Lyn Collins – lead vocals
- James Brown – co-vocals
- Roberta DuBois, DeDe Kinard, Gigi Kinard – backing vocals
- Ken Tibbetts, probably Howard McGurty – trumpet
- Fred Wesley – trombone
- Alfred "Pee Wee" Ellis – alto saxophone, arrangement, conducting
- Les Asch – tenor saxophone
- David Parkinson – baritone saxophone
- Tim Hedding – electric organ
- "Fat Eddie" Setser – electric guitar
- Dave Harrison – bass guitar
- probably Julius Reliford – congas
- William "Beau Dollar" Bowman – drums

== Since You Been Gone ==
"Since You Been Gone"

Song by James Brown

from the album Motherlode
- Released: 1988
- Recorded: June 30, 1970
- Studio: Starday-King (Nashville, Tennessee)
- Genre: Funk
- Length: 5:33 (Motherlode); 4:58 (Funk Power 1970)
- Label: Polydor
- Songwriter: James Brown

Audio video
- "Since You Been Gone" on YouTube

"Since You Been Gone" is a funk remake of "Just Won't Do Right" performed by James Brown and first released on the Motherlode album in 1988. The song was recorded on June 30, 1970 during the same session as Super Bad and features lyrics from the 1962 re-recording of "Just Won't Do Right" backed by the guitar melody of "Give It Up or Turnit a Loose" with an additional guitar lick that would be used in the 1970 remake of that song recorded soon afterwards. A version without cuts and featuring James Brown on piano was released in 1996 as part of the Funk Power 1970: A Brand New Thang album.

=== Personnel ===
- James Brown – lead vocals, piano
- Bobby Byrd – co-vocals
- Phelps "Catfish" Collins – electric guitar
- William "Bootsy" Collins – bass guitar
- Johnny Griggs – congas
- Clyde Stubblefield – drums
