= The Bells (Billy Ward and His Dominoes song) =

1952 song

Single by Billy Ward and His Dominoes

from the album Billy Ward & His Dominoes
- A-side: "Pedal Pushin' Papa"
- Released: 1952
- Genre: Rhythm and blues
- Length: 3:10
- Label: Federal
- Songwriters: Billy Ward; Rose Marks

"The Bells"

Single by James Brown

from the album The Amazing James Brown
- B-side: "And I Do Just What I Want"
- Released: 1960
- Recorded: 1960
- Genre: Rhythm and blues
- Length: 2:54
- Label: King
- Songwriter: Billy Ward

James Brown charting singles chronology
| "This Old Heart" (1960) | "The Bells" (1960) | "Bewildered" (1961) |

Audio video
- "The Bells" on YouTube

"The Bells" is a rhythm and blues song written by Billy Ward and Rose Ann Marks and recorded by Billy Ward and His Dominoes in 1952, featuring Clyde McPhatter on lead tenor. It was released on Federal Records as the B-side of the group's single "Pedal Pushin' Papa". It was a bigger hit than the A-side, reaching #3 on the R&B chart. ("Pedal Pushin' Papa" charted #4 R&B.)

== James Brown version ==
"The Bells" played an important part in the early careers of James Brown and The Famous Flames. In their performances on the Chitlin' Circuit the group would act out the story of bereavement told in the lyrics, pushing a doll representing the dead woman across the stage in a baby carriage. As they passed Brown, he would fall to his knees crying and sobbing, eventually segueing into "Please, Please, Please". The routine was so popular that audiences sometimes became violent if they tried to perform the song without it.

Brown recorded "The Bells" in 1960 as his first single for King Records. It reached number 68 on the Billboard pop chart.
