= James Brown Plays James Brown Today & Yesterday =

Studio album by James Brown
- Released: November 1965
- Recorded: September 10, 1965
- Studio: Criteria Studios (Miami, Florida)
- Genre: Soul
- Length: 46:53
- Label: Smash
- Producer: James Brown

James Brown chronology
Papa's Got a Brand New Bag (1965)	James Brown Plays James Brown Today & Yesterday (1965)	I Got You (I Feel Good) (1966)

Singles from James Brown Plays James Brown Today & Yesterday
- 1. "Try Me" Released: October 1965

Professional ratings
Review scores
Source	Rating
AllMusic	2/5 stars
Record Mirror	4/5 stars
The Rolling Stone Album Guide	2.5/5 stars

James Brown Plays James Brown Today & Yesterday is the tenth studio album by American musician James Brown. The album was released in November 1965, by Smash Records.

== Chart performance ==
The album debuted on Billboard magazine's Top LP's chart in the issue dated November 20, 1965, peaking at No. 42 during a nineteen-week run on the chart.

== Track listing ==
All tracks composed by James Brown; except where indicated

No.	Title	Writer(s)	Length
1.	"Papa's Got a Brand New Bag, Pt. 1"		3:53
2.	"Papa's Got a Brand New Bag, Pt. 2"		4:26
3.	"Oh Baby Don't You Weep"		6:46
4.	"Try Me"		3:08
5.	"Sidewinder"	Lee Morgan	6:56
6.	"Out of Sight"	Ted Wright	2:38
7.	"Maybe the Last Time"	Ted Wright	5:14
8.	"Every Beat of My Heart"	Johnny Otis	5:02
9.	"Hold It"	Billy Butler, Clifford Scott	4:38
10.	"A Song For My Father, Pt. 1"	Horace Silver	2:18
11.	"A Song For My Father, Pt. 2"	Horace Silver	1:48

== Personnel ==
- James Brown – organ
- Ron Tooley, Joe Dupars, Teddy Washington, possibly Levi Rasbury – trumpet
- unknown – trombone
- Nat Jones – alto saxophone
- St. Clair Pinckney, Eldee Williams, Clifford “Ace King” MacMillan – tenor saxophone
- Charles Carr – baritone saxophone
- Jimmy Nolen, Alfonzo Kellum – guitar
- Alfonzo Kellum or Bernard Odum – bass
- Obie Williams, Melvin Parker – drums

== Charts ==
Chart (1965)	Peak position
US Billboard Top LPs	42
