= Anna King (singer) =

American soul singer (1937–2002)

- Born: Anna Dolores Williams; December 9, 1937; Philadelphia, Pennsylvania, U.S.
- Died: October 21, 2002 (aged 64) Philadelphia, Pennsylvania, U.S.
- Genres: Soul, gospel
- Occupation: Singer
- Years active: 1950s–1970s
- Labels: Malibu, Smash, End

Anna King (born Anna Dolores Williams; December 9, 1937, to October 21, 2002) was an American soul and gospel singer who performed with both James Brown and Duke Ellington.

== Biography ==
She was born Anna Dolores Williams in Philadelphia, and grew up singing in her church. She was involved with various gospel groups from the age of twelve, including Youth For Christ and later the True Light Gospel Singers, before being discovered by Luther Dixon of Scepter Records. He persuaded her to record secular music, and she recorded two unsuccessful singles in 1961, released on the Malibu label. She toured with Chuck Jackson and the Shirelles, and recorded for Dixon's own Ludix label in 1962.

In 1963, she auditioned successfully to replace Tammy Montgomery (later known as Tammi Terrell) in James Brown's touring revue. As well as touring with Brown, she signed as a solo singer to Smash Records, and recorded a song written and produced by Brown, "If Somebody Told You", which reached number 67 on the Billboard Hot 100, and number 10 on Cash Box's R&B chart, at the start of 1964. As a follow-up, she recorded a duet with Famous Flames member Bobby Byrd, "Baby Baby Baby", which rose to number 52 on the pop chart later that year. She also recorded an album, Back To Soul, produced by James Brown, which included what critic Richie Unterberger describes as King's "gritty and powerful" singing on such tracks as "If You Don't Think".

After releasing two more singles, King left James Brown's revue in late 1964, and recorded "Mama's Got a Bag of Her Own", an answer record to Brown's "Papa's Got a Brand New Bag". Released on the End label, it was written and produced by Ronald Moseley and Robert Bateman, but was not a hit. She then formed a band with another former member of Brown's revue, Sam Lathan, and toured for a year with other soul musicians, before giving up the secular music business. However, in about 1966, she was contacted by Duke Ellington, who recruited her to sing at his sacred music concerts over the following eighteen months.

In the late 1960s she joined the Brockington Choral Ensemble, a gospel choir, and recorded with them on the Arctic and Hob labels. By the mid-1970s, she gave up singing and turned to preaching, as an ordained minister of the church.

King died in Philadelphia in 2002, aged 64.
