= Baby You're Right =

1961 single by Joe Tex

Single by Joe Tex
- B-side: "Ain't I a Mess"
- Released: March 1961
- Genre: Rhythm and blues
- Length: 2:15
- Label: Anna (1128)
- Songwriter(s): Joe Tex
- Producer(s): Roquel Davis

"Baby, You're Right"

Single by James Brown

from the album Think!
- B-side: "I'll Never, Never Let You Go"
- Released: 1961
- Recorded: 1960
- Studio: United, Hollywood, California
- Genre: Rhythm and blues
- Length: 3:05
- Label: King (5524)
- Songwriter(s): Joe Tex; James Brown
- Producer(s): Syd Nathan

James Brown charting singles chronology
"I Don't Mind" (1961)	"Baby, You're Right" (1961)	"I Love You, Yes I Do" / "Just You and Me, Darling" (1961)

Audio video
- "Baby You're Right" on YouTube

"Baby You're Right" is a song by Joe Tex. He recorded it for Anna Records in 1961. Tex re-recorded "Baby You're Right" for Checker Records in 1965.

== James Brown recording ==
Later in 1961, James Brown recorded the song, altering the melody and lyrics and adding a songwriting credit for himself. Released as a single on King Records, his version was a hit, charting #2 R&B and #49 Pop in 1962. It also appeared on the album Think! in 1960, and later on Papa's Got a Brand New Bag in 1965. An alternate take of the song was included in the 1991 box set Star Time.
