= Bewildered =

Single by James Brown and the Famous Flames

from the album Think!
- B-side: "If You Want Me"
- Released: February 1961
- Recorded: January 30, 1959, Beltone Studios, New York, NY
- Genre: R&B, doo-wop
- Length: 2:21
- Label: King
- Songwriters: Teddy Powell; Leonard Whitcup
- Producer: Andy Gibson

James Brown charting singles chronology
"The Bells" (1961)	"Bewildered" (1961)	"I Don't Mind" (1961)

Audio video
- "Bewildered" on YouTube

"Bewildered" is a popular song written in 1936 by Teddy Powell and Leonard Whitcup. It was a 1938 hit for Tommy Dorsey and His Orchestra.

== 1948 recordings ==
The song was revived in the late 1940s when two different versions, by the Red Miller Trio and Amos Milburn, reached number one on the R&B chart in 1948 (neither of them made the pop chart). Both these versions departed significantly from the original published melody and influenced later recordings.

== James Brown and the Famous Flames version ==
James Brown and the Famous Flames recorded "Bewildered" in 1959. Their doo-wop–tinged rendition was somewhat similar to the Amos Milburn version, with a strong triplet feeling and a heavily melismatic vocal line. It was first released as a track on Brown's 1960 album Think!. The following year it was issued as a single, which reached the R&B Top Ten and became Brown's second single (after "Think") to enter the pop Top 40 (US charts: number 8 R&B; number 40 pop).

"Bewildered" became a staple of Brown's concerts for much of his career. It was featured in a medley on his breakthrough 1963 album Live at the Apollo and appeared on several of his later live albums, including Revolution of the Mind: Recorded Live at the Apollo, Vol. III (1971) and Love, Power, Peace (1992). He also recorded new studio versions for the albums Prisoner of Love (1963) and Sex Machine (1970).

=== Personnel ===
- James Brown – lead vocal

And The Famous Flames:

- Louis Madison – vocals, piano
- Bobby Bennett – vocals
- Baby Lloyd Stallworth – vocals
- Johnny Terry – vocals
- Willie Johnson – vocals

with the James Brown Band:

- George Dorsey – alto saxophone
- J.C. Davis – tenor saxophone
- Bobby Roach – guitar
- Bernard Odum – bass guitar
- Nat Kendrick – drums

== Other versions ==
"Bewildered" was subsequently recorded by several others, including R&B performers:

- Also in 1938, it was also recorded by Mildred Bailey.
- Billy Eckstine and the Ink Spots, with Eckstine's version reaching number 4 on the R&B chart and number 27 on the pop chart.
- British Skiffle star Lonnie Donegan recorded the song in 1959.
- A decade later it was recorded by Mickey & Sylvia, again with an altered melody similar to that of the Red Miller Trio recording.
- "Bewildered" was also covered in 1990 by the Notting Hillbillies on their album Missing...Presumed Having a Good Time.
- "Bewildered" was also covered in 1996 by Roots Reggae artist Bim Sherman.
