= Lost Someone =

1961 song by James Brown

Single by James Brown

from the album I Got You (I Feel Good)
- B-side: "Cross Firing"
- Released: November 1961
- Recorded: February 9, 1961, King Studios, Cincinnati, OH
- Genre: Soul
- Length: 3:05
- Label: King; 5573
- Songwriters: James Brown; Bobby Byrd; Lloyd Eugene Stallworth
- Producer: Unknown

James Brown charting singles chronology
"Just You and Me, Darling" (1961)	"Lost Someone" (1961)	"Night Train" (1962)

Audio video
- "Lost Someone" on YouTube

"Lost Someone"

Single by James Brown

from the album Live at the Apollo
- B-side: "I'll Go Crazy"
- Released: January 1966
- Recorded: October 24, 1962, Apollo Theater, New York, NY
- Genre: Soul
- Length: 2:42
- Label: King; 6020
- Songwriters: James Brown; Bobby Byrd; Lloyd Eugene Stallworth
- Producer: James Brown

James Brown charting singles chronology
"I Got You (I Feel Good)" (1965)	"Lost Someone" (1966)	"I'll Go Crazy" (1966)

"Lost Someone" is a song recorded by James Brown in 1961. It was written by Brown and Famous Flames members Bobby Byrd and Baby Lloyd Stallworth. Like "Please, Please, Please" before it, the song's lyrics combine a lament for lost love with a plea for forgiveness. The single was a #2 R&B hit and reached #48 on the pop chart. According to Brown, "Lost Someone" is based on the chord changes of the Conway Twitty song "It's Only Make Believe". Although Brown's vocal group, The Famous Flames did not actually sing on this tune, two of them, Byrd and Stallworth, co-wrote it with Brown, and Byrd played organ on the record, making it, in effect, a James Brown/Famous Flames recording.

== Personnel ==
- James Brown – lead vocal

with the James Brown Band:

- Roscoe Patrick – trumpet
- J.C. Davis – tenor saxophone
- Bobby Byrd – Hammond organ
- Les Buie – guitar
- Hubert Parry – bass guitar
- Nat Kendrick – drums
- Other instruments unknown

== Live at the Apollo version ==
A performance of "Lost Someone" is the centerpiece of Brown's 1963 album Live at the Apollo. Nearly 11 minutes long and spanning two tracks on the original LP release (the end of Side 1 and the beginning of Side 2), it is widely regarded as the album's high point and as one of the greatest performances in its idiom on record. Critic Peter Guralnick wrote of the recording:

Here, in a single, multilayered track ... you have embodied the whole history of soul music, the teaching, the preaching, the endless assortment of gospel effects, above all the groove that was at the music's core. "Don't go to strangers," James pleads in his abrasively vulnerable fashion. "Come on home to me.... Gee whiz I love you.... I'm so weak...." Over and over he repeats the simple phrases, insists "I'll love you tomorrow" until the music is rocking with a steady pulse, until the music grabs you in the pit of the stomach and James knows he's got you. Then he works the audience as he works the song, teasing, tantalizing, drawing closer, dancing away, until finally at the end of Side I that voice breaks through the crowd noise and dissipates the tension as it calls out, "James, you're an asshole." "I believe someone out there loves someone," declares James with cruel disingenuousness. "Yeah, you," replies a girl's voice with unabashed fervor. "I feel so good I want to scream," says James, testing the limits yet again. "Scream!" cries a voice. And the record listener responds, too, we are drawn in by the same tricks, so transparent in the daylight but put across with the same unabashed fervor with which the girl in the audience offers up her love.

An edited version of the live performance was released as a single in 1966 and charted at #94 on the US Pop chart.

Long, drawn-out performances of "Lost Someone" continued to be a feature of Brown's live shows until 1966, when "It's a Man's Man's Man's World" largely supplanted it in his concert repertoire. Brown would sometimes interpolate parts of "Lost Someone" into the newer song, as in the 1967 performance documented on Live at the Apollo, Volume II.

== Personnel ==
- James Brown – lead vocal

with the James Brown Band:

- Lewis Hamlin – music director, principal trumpet
- Roscoe Patrick – trumpet
- Teddy Washington – trumpet
- Dickie Wells – trombone
- William "Po' Devil" Burgess – alto saxophone
- St. Clair Pinckney – principal tenor saxophone
- Al "Briscoe" Clark – tenor and baritone saxophones
- Les Buie – guitar
- Bobby Byrd – Hammond organ
- Hubert Parry – bass guitar
- Clayton Fillyau – principal drums
- George Sims – drums

== Other versions ==
Brown made several other recordings of "Lost Someone", including:

- A version with strings for his 1963 album Prisoner of Love.
- A studio version similar to the 1962 Apollo performance on 1972's Get On The Good Foot.
- An uptempo version on 1974's Hell.

== Covers ==
- The Residents recorded a satirical cover version of the intro to "Lost Someone" for their 1984 Brown and George Gershwin tribute album George & James.
- Cat Power recorded "Lost Someone" for her 2008 album Jukebox.
