= T.A.M.I. Show =

1964 American film of rock & roll and rhythm & blues performances

- Movie poster
- Directed by: Steve Binder
- Produced by: Lee Savin
- Starring: The Barbarians; The Beach Boys; Chuck Berry; James Brown and the Famous Flames; Marvin Gaye; Gerry and the Pacemakers; Lesley Gore; Jan and Dean; Billy J. Kramer and the Dakotas; The Miracles; The Rolling Stones; The Supremes
- Cinematography: James E. Kilgore
- Edited by: Kent Mackenzie; Bruce Pierce
- Production companies: Screen Entertainment Co. Screencraft International
- Distributed by: American International Pictures
- Release date: November 14, 1964
- Running time: 112 minutes
- Country: United States
- Language: English

James Brown performing in the show

T.A.M.I. Show is a 1964 American concert film directed by Steve Binder and released by American International Pictures. It includes performances by numerous popular rock and roll and R&B musicians from the United States and England.

In 2006, T.A.M.I. Show was deemed "culturally, historically, or aesthetically significant" by the United States Library of Congress and selected for preservation in the National Film Registry.

== Production ==
The concert was held at the Santa Monica Civic Auditorium on October 28 and 29, 1964. Free tickets were distributed to local high school students. The acronym "T.A.M.I." was used inconsistently in the show's publicity to mean both "Teenage Awards Music International" and "Teen Age Music International". The best footage from both concert dates was used in the film. Jack Nitzsche was the show's music director.

Jan and Dean emceed the event and performed its theme song, "(Here They Come) From All Over the World", written by Los Angeles songwriters P.F. Sloan and Steve Barri. The song erroneously asserts that the Rolling Stones are from Liverpool. Director Steve Binder recalled that Bobby Roberts suggested Jan and Dean host the film.

The film's opening sequence was shot with a handheld film camera. The concerts were shot by director Steve Binder and his crew from The Steve Allen Show, using a precursor to high-definition television, called "Electronovision", invented by the self-taught "electronics whiz" Bill Sargent (H.W. Sargent Jr). The film was the second of a small number of productions that used the system. By using the 25 frames per second 819-line video standard (in use in France for television broadcasting at the time), the video could be converted to film by kinescope recording with sufficiently enhanced resolution to allow big-screen enlargement.

T.A.M.I. Show is particularly well known for the performance of James Brown and the Famous Flames, which features his legendary dance moves and explosive energy. In interviews, Keith Richards of the Rolling Stones has claimed that choosing to follow Brown and the Famous Flames (Bobby Byrd, Bobby Bennett, and Lloyd Stallworth) was the worst mistake of their careers, because no matter how well they performed, they could not top him. In a web-published interview, Binder takes credit for persuading the Stones to follow Brown, and serve as the centerpiece for the grand finale in which all the performers dance together onstage.

Motown Records, which by 1964 had experienced its first wave of chart-busting crossover success, was represented by three of its top acts: the Miracles, Marvin Gaye, and the Supremes. The Miracles (Smokey Robinson, Bobby Rogers, Pete Moore, Ronnie White and Marv Tarplin) had, three months earlier, lost the services of their sole female member, Claudette (Mrs. Smokey) Robinson. Claudette, who retired from touring for health reasons, remained as a non-touring member of the Miracles, recording with the group in the studio only. Marvin Gaye, backed by Shindig! favorites the Blossoms, sang several of his greatest hits. The show also featured the Supremes during their reign as the most successful female recording group of the era. The group had three chart-topping singles from July 1964 to December 1964, with the album Where Did Our Love Go reaching number two. Diana Ross went on to work with Binder on several of her television specials, including her first solo television special and her famous Central Park concert, Live from New York Worldwide: For One and for All.

Throughout the show, a variety of go-go dancers including Teri Garr performed in the background or beside the performers, under the direction of choreographer David Winters, assisted by Toni Basil. According to filmmaker John Landis's DVD commentary for the film's trailer, he and seventh-grade classmate David Cassidy were in the audience for the show.

== List of performers ==
=== Performers ===
(in order of appearance)

- Chuck Berry
- Gerry and the Pacemakers:
  - Gerry Marsden - vocals, guitar
  - Les Maguire - piano
  - Les Chadwick - bass
  - Freddie Marsden - drums, backing vocals
- The Miracles:
  - Smokey Robinson - lead vocals
  - Bobby Rogers - tenor vocals
  - Ronnie White - baritone vocals
  - Pete Moore - bass vocals
  - Marv Tarplin - guitar
- Marvin Gaye (and The Blossoms):
  - Marvin Gaye - vocals
  - Fanita James - backing vocals
  - Darlene Love - backing vocals
  - Jean King - backing vocals
- Lesley Gore
- Jan and Dean:
  - Jan Berry - vocals
  - Dean Torrence - vocals
- The Beach Boys:
  - Brian Wilson - bass, vocals
  - Mike Love - vocals
  - Al Jardine - guitar, vocals
  - Carl Wilson - guitar, vocals
  - Dennis Wilson - drums
- Billy J. Kramer and the Dakotas:
  - Billy J. Kramer - vocals
  - Mike Maxfield - guitar
  - Mick Green - guitar
  - Robin MacDonald - bass
  - Tony Mansfield - drums
- The Supremes:
  - Diana Ross - Lead vocals
  - Florence Ballard - backing vocals
  - Mary Wilson - backing vocals
- The Barbarians:
  - Jerry Causi - bass, vocals
  - Ronnie Enos - guitar, vocals
  - Bruce Benson - guitar
  - Victor "Moulty" Moulton - drums
- James Brown and the Famous Flames:
  - James Brown - vocals
  - Bobby Byrd - vocals
  - Lloyd Stallworth - vocals
  - Bobby Bennett - vocals
- The Rolling Stones:
  - Mick Jagger - vocals, maracas
  - Keith Richards - guitar, vocals
  - Brian Jones - guitar, backing vocals
  - Bill Wyman - bass, backing vocals
  - Charlie Watts - drums

== Set list ==
In order of appearance in the film:

Artist	Song Title
Jan and Dean (Over credits)	"(Here They Come) From All Over the World"
Chuck Berry	"Johnny B. Goode"
Chuck Berry	"Maybellene"
Gerry and the Pacemakers	"Maybellene"
Gerry and the Pacemakers	"Don't Let the Sun Catch You Crying"
Gerry and the Pacemakers	"It's Gonna Be Alright"
Chuck Berry	"Sweet Little Sixteen"
Gerry and the Pacemakers	"How Do You Do It?"
Chuck Berry	"Nadine"
Gerry and the Pacemakers	"I Like It"
(Smokey Robinson and) The Miracles	"That's What Love Is Made Of"
(Smokey Robinson and) The Miracles	"You've Really Got a Hold on Me"
(Smokey Robinson and) The Miracles	"Mickey's Monkey"
Marvin Gaye	"Stubborn Kind of Fellow"
Marvin Gaye	"Pride and Joy"
Marvin Gaye	"Can I Get a Witness"
Marvin Gaye	"Hitch Hike"
Lesley Gore	"Maybe I Know"
Lesley Gore	"You Don't Own Me"
Lesley Gore	"You Didn't Look Around"
Lesley Gore	"Hey Now"
Lesley Gore	"It's My Party"
Lesley Gore	"Judy's Turn to Cry"
Jan and Dean	"The Little Old Lady from Pasadena"
Jan and Dean	"Sidewalk Surfin'"
The Beach Boys	"Surfin' U.S.A."
The Beach Boys	"I Get Around"
The Beach Boys	"Surfer Girl"
The Beach Boys	"Dance, Dance, Dance"
Billy J. Kramer and The Dakotas	"Little Children"
Billy J. Kramer and The Dakotas	"Bad to Me"
Billy J. Kramer and The Dakotas	"I'll Keep You Satisfied"
Billy J. Kramer and The Dakotas	"From a Window"
The Supremes	"When the Lovelight Starts Shining Through His Eyes"
The Supremes	"Run, Run, Run"
The Supremes	"Baby Love"
The Supremes	"Where Did Our Love Go"
The Barbarians	"Hey Little Bird"
James Brown and The Famous Flames	"Out of Sight"
James Brown and The Famous Flames	"Prisoner of Love"
James Brown and The Famous Flames	"Please, Please, Please"
James Brown and The Famous Flames	"Night Train"
The Rolling Stones	"Around and Around"
The Rolling Stones	"Off the Hook"
The Rolling Stones	"Time Is on My Side"
The Rolling Stones	"It's All Over Now"
The Rolling Stones	"I'm Alright"
The Rolling Stones	"Let's Get Together"

== Release ==
T.A.M.I. Show opened in Los Angeles on November 14, 1964. The film was originally distributed by Electronovision Productions. American International Pictures acquired the distribution rights to the film in December. The film opened in New York City on January 27, 1965.

Dick Clark Productions later acquired ownership of the film.

=== Home media ===
During the VHS era, there was never an authorized home video release of T.A.M.I. Show in its full, original cut, although bootlegs abounded. Most of the bootlegs were missing the Beach Boys' performance. The Beach Boys had been deleted from all prints made after the movie's initial theatrical run because of a copyright dispute by the request of someone in their management. Selected numbers from the T.A.M.I. Show were edited together with performances from another concert film by the same producers, The Big T.N.T. Show, to create a hybrid work called That Was Rock. This film did receive a home video release from Media Home Entertainment's music division, Music Media, in 1984. It was felt that the film was unlikely to be released due to the cost of obtaining the publishing and performance rights to the extensive lineup of artists. (All of the four Beach Boys songs from the show eventually surfaced on DVD in Sights and Sounds of Summer, a special CD/DVD edition of Sounds of Summer: The Very Best of The Beach Boys.)

On March 23, 2010, Shout! Factory released T.A.M.I. Show on a restored, digitally remastered and fully authorized DVD, with all performances, including the Beach Boys, included. (A DVD release of the complete film by First Look Studios had been planned for 2007, but subsequently withdrawn.)

On December 2, 2016, T.A.M.I. Show was released in Blu-ray as a combo package with The Big T.N.T. Show by Shout! Factory. Both features are presented in 1080p resolution, 1.78:1 aspect ratio and DTS-HD Master Audio Stereo.

The film was shown in its entirety in Canada on First Choice Network in 1984, the 20th anniversary of its release.

== Legacy ==
Experimental filmmaker Wallace Berman, a friend of choreographer Toni Basil, refilmed a screening of T.A.M.I. Show using an 8 mm camera. He used close-ups of Mick Jagger and Teri Garr in his 1966 collage film Aleph.

In 2006, T.A.M.I. Show was deemed "culturally, historically, or aesthetically significant" by the United States Library of Congress and selected for preservation in the National Film Registry.
