= Bobby Byrd =

American singer, songwriter, and producer (1934–2007)

- Also known as: "Byrd"
- Born: Bobby Howard Byrd; August 15, 1934; Toccoa, Georgia, U.S.
- Died: September 12, 2007 (aged 73) Loganville, Georgia, U.S.
- Genres: Soul; R&B; funk
- Occupations: Singer; songwriter; record producer; musician; talent scout; pianist
- Years active: 1952–1996
- Labels: King; Polydor; People; Kwanza; Atlantic
- Formerly of: The Famous Flames

Bobby Howard Byrd (August 15, 1934 – September 12, 2007) was an American rhythm and blues, soul and funk singer, songwriter, musician, record producer, bandleader, pianist and talent dedicated. He played a part in the development of soul and funk music in association with James Brown, whom he discovered. He was the actual founder and original leader of The Famous Flames, the vocal group with whom James Brown first became famous, and was a 2012 posthumous inductee into the Rock and Roll Hall of Fame with The Famous Flames.

Byrd began his career in 1952 as a member of the gospel group, the Gospel Starlighters, who later changed their name to the Avons in 1953 and the Five Royals in 1954, before settling on the name the Flames in 1955 prior to Brown's joining the group; their agent later changed it to the Famous Flames. Byrd, the founder of the Flames, is credited with the discovery of James Brown, and also claimed responsibility for writing most of Brown's hits. As group founder, and one of the longest-serving members of the group, Byrd was inducted into the Rock & Roll Hall of Fame posthumously in 2012 as a member of the Famous Flames. Byrd was also a 1998 recipient of the Rhythm and Blues Foundation's Pioneer Award, and was inducted into the National Rhythm and Blues Hall of Fame with the Famous Flames in 2020.

== Early life and career ==
Bobby Howard Byrd was born in Toccoa, Georgia, to a religiously devout family where they were respected members of the church congregation and active in their neighborhood. Byrd started being active in his local church choir with the gospel group, the Zioneers, later making a name for himself as member of the Gospel Starlighters, which included his sister Sarah. At a time when church elders disapproved of secular singing, the band members would leave their home state and perform in South Carolina as the R&B group the Avons, leaving gospel behind. The original group consisted of Byrd, who played piano and organ and sang lead vocals, Nafloyd Scott, Fred Pulliam, and Doyle Oglesby.

== Meeting James Brown and the formation of the Famous Flames ==
In 1952, Byrd formed and sang with a gospel group called the Gospel Starlighters. During a friendly baseball match at a juvenile prison, he met a young James Brown who was serving time there on robbery charges. Byrd befriended him and arranged for Byrd's family to oversee Brown's parole. This began a personal and professional association that lasted until 1973.

Although Byrd would eventually have over twenty years as a solo performer, it is his association with Brown for which he is chiefly remembered. Contrary to popular belief, the group had already changed its name to the Flames when Brown asked Byrd for a spot in the group, with Brown first settling as a drummer. Eventually Brown was driven to perform as lead singer, as he felt lead vocalists got more attention from women. Byrd recognized early on that Brown was unique, and it would be impossible to control him: "I didn't need him in competition, I needed him with me, that's why I worked so hard to get him over to my group." In 1956, Clint Brantley signed on as the group's manager. With Johnny Terry and Nash Knox on board, the group became "The Famous Flames" and won a deal with Ralph Bass' Federal label, which was a subsidiary of Syd Nathan's King Records, in February 1956. Their first record, "Please, Please, Please," which Byrd said he wrote with Johnny Terry, featured a lead vocal by James Brown and was issued under the billing "James Brown and the Famous Flames," which did not sit well with the rest of the group. After just three sessions, the original Flames broke up.

The Flames without Brown changed their name to Byrd's Drops of Joy. However, they found little success. When Brown approached them to reform the Flames, they agreed. At this point, the Famous Flames ceased being a vocal/instrumental group and became a straight vocal group since Brown had begun to employ the old J.C. Davis outfit as his road band. Original Flames members Bobby Byrd and Johnny Terry returned, and new Flames members Bobby Bennett and Baby Lloyd Stallworth were added. Along with Brown, these four men comprised the longest-lasting lineup of The Famous Flames. Original Flames guitarist Nafloyd Scott also returned and was added to the band. The rest of the original Flames faded into obscurity.

With this lineup, the group would have a series of hits between 1959 and 1964 and participated in many of the albums that helped to bring R&B to a crossover audience, including the landmark million-selling 1963 live album, Live at the Apollo. Byrd and the Famous Flames also performed together on a few episodes of The Ed Sullivan Show, made a brief appearance in the 1965 Frankie Avalon film Ski Party, and upstaged headliners the Rolling Stones in the landmark 1964 rock concert/motion picture The T.A.M.I. Show. Byrd (and fellow Famous Flame Lloyd Stallworth) were credited as songwriters on the Flames hit "Lost Someone." However, Brown was the only member who sang on the recording. Its success led Brown to record more songs on his own, but the majority of his early hits were as a member of the Famous Flames, including songs such as "Try Me," "I'll Go Crazy," "Bewildered," "Think," "Baby You're Right," "I Don't Mind," "This Old Heart," "Shout and Shimmy," "Good Good Lovin," and "Oh Baby Don't You Weep". As was the case with some recordings, the Famous Flames were often not credited on album covers, though ironically enough, on recordings in which Brown appeared by himself, the group was credited, leaving fans to erroneously believe the Famous Flames were actually Brown's backing band, instead of the singing group that they actually were. The group continued performing together until 1968, when they left over monetary issues. The last Flames-associated recording to be released was the pre-funk soul hit "Licking Stick – Licking Stick," to which Byrd contributed vocals without the other members, who had departed before Byrd did that summer.

== Solo career and continual work with Brown ==
After two years away, Byrd reunited with Brown in 1970. He hired, on the spot and without rehearsal, Bootsy Collins, Bootsy's brother Catfish, and their band to fill in for Brown's former band after they left him before a gig. After that performance, Byrd and Brown brought the band to a studio session where they recorded the famous funk hit "Get Up (I Feel Like Being a) Sex Machine."

When the Famous Flames were still together, Byrd and Brown co-formed the production company Fair Deal to distribute the Famous Flames' recordings—and Brown's own solo recordings—to mainstream markets after years solely on the rhythm and blues circuit. This led to both Byrd and Brown signing solo deals with Smash Records. In 1964, Byrd recorded his first solo hit, "Baby, Baby, Baby," with Anna King. A year later, he had a bigger R&B hit with "We Are in Love," which reached #14. Later in the late 1960s, as Byrd and Brown together began working under the yet-to-be-named genre of funk, Byrd had a funk hit song with "I Need Help (I Can't Do It Alone)," which reached #14 R&B, (#79 Pop) in 1970.

In 1971, when Brown signed with Polydor Records, he and Byrd formed the label People Records, and issued several records by other artists, including Byrd himself, who recorded the funk hit "I Know You Got Soul" (1971). Byrd appeared onstage with Brown from 1970 until leaving his band again in 1973 due to a combination of issues, including uncredited compositions on some Brown hits, Brown's issues with singer Vicki Anderson, whom Byrd eventually married and remained with until his death, and wanting to start a family with Anderson. Though he remained in contact with Brown following this final split, this departure ended Byrd's 21-year professional association with Brown, who now went by the nickname "Godfather of Soul", after composing the soundtrack to the film, Black Caesar (1973). Without Byrd's help, however, Brown began struggling with the production of the music on People Records and soon began experiencing financial troubles. Byrd recorded the song "Back From The Dead" in 1975.

In 1993, Byrd recorded a solo album, On the Move, on the German record Label, Soulciety Records. After a few more live performances, Byrd decided to retire in 1996, though he occasionally re-emerged with the assistance of Brown. Following Brown's parole from drug and weapons charges in 1991, he hired Byrd to join him on stage for his pay-per-view 1992 concert. Byrd would occasionally perform with Brown in some venues. They would also collaborate on the song "Killing Is Out, School Is In" from Brown's final studio album, 2002's The Next Step. At his funeral in December 2006, Byrd sang "Sex Machine" with Brown's other bandmates.

In 2003, a few years before his death, Bobby, his wife Vicki, and Famous Flames Bobby Bennett and Lloyd Stallworth sued lead singer James Brown and Universal Music for non-payment of royalties, stating that monies that rightfully belonged to them for numerous Famous Flames hits, and Byrd's hit "I Know You Got Soul," which was sampled by numerous rappers, including Eric B. & Rakim, were sent by Universal to James Brown instead, who allegedly kept them. The suit was dismissed due to the statute of limitations having run out. However, rapper Jay-Z, who sampled Byrd's song "I'm Not to Blame" for his recording "U Don't Know" on his 2001 multimillion-selling The Blueprint, paid Byrd 65% of the royalties for the song, allowing Byrd and his family to secure a mortgage for their home, which was worth about $250,000.

== Personal life ==
After splitting from Brown in 1973, Byrd and Vicki Anderson, who left Brown's band at the same time as Byrd, got married. Byrd had three children with his first wife, Gail Harbin Byrd, (Walda, Orrin and Ruthie) in Toccoa, Georgia. He also had two children from another relationship. Byrd raised Anderson's children, including Carleen. The couple remained married until Byrd's death. Though he had moved to Cincinnati after the Famous Flames signed with Federal/King, Byrd retained residences in Georgia and, after leaving Brown, settled at Loganville for the remainder of his life.

=== Death ===
Byrd died of cancer on September 12, 2007, at the age of 73.

== Legacy ==
Numerous songs in hip hop music have sampled Byrd-associated songs, such as "I Know You Got Soul," "Think (About It)," "Get Up (I Feel Like Being a) Sex Machine," "Soul Power," "Make It Funky" and "I'm Not to Blame." Byrd's music has had a lasting influence on numerous soul, R&B, and hip-hop artists.

On the Famous Flames' Rock & Roll Hall of Fame page, Byrd is described as "one of the more important auxiliary figures in the career of a major artist in music history."

In October 2004, Byrd's songs "I Know You Got Soul" and "Hot Pants" were featured on the Grand Theft Auto: San Andreas soundtrack, playing on fictional radio station Master Sounds 98.3. In September 2005, his song "Try It Again" appeared on the soundtrack of Indigo Prophecy.

Byrd was portrayed by actor Nelsan Ellis in the 2014 James Brown biopic Get on Up.

== Induction to the Rock and Roll Hall of Fame and initial controversy ==
In 1986 Rock & Roll Hall of Fame officials announced that James Brown would be included in a list of the first nine musicians to be inducted by the organization. However, Brown did not meet the Hall of Fame's criteria for induction at that time, which required an artist to have released their first single as a solo artist at least 25 years prior to induction. Brown's first solo release in 1965 was only 21 years before, although Brown had been active in the industry and released songs as part of The Famous Flames prior to 1965. For Brown to be inducted by the organization in 1986, the inclusion of the other members of the Famous Flames was required.

Brown's inclusion as a solo artist without the other Flames members was met with criticism but was not amended until years later. In late 2011, the Rock & Roll Hall of Fame formed a special committee to discuss several pioneering groups they felt deserved to be inducted but were initially excluded in error, due to the impact of their lead singers, who were incorrectly inducted as solo artists. This committee's decision led to the induction of the Famous Flames and its members. This was an amending gesture that did not require nomination or voting, under the premise that they should have been inducted with Brown back in 1986 since, according to Rock Hall CEO Terry Stewart, Brown's first solo recording missed the 25-year criterion for performing musicians. Brown, Byrd, Stallworth, and Terry had all died by this point, and Bobby Bennett, the Flames' only surviving member, accepted the honor on behalf of the group in Cleveland, on April 14, 2012. Less than a year after the induction, Bennett himself died on January 18, 2013.

In 2015, Byrd was nominated for a second induction into the Rock & Roll Hall of Fame as a member of the J.B.'s, a group which he discovered in 1970 to replace the Original James Brown Band, who left Brown in 1970 (as the Famous Flames left him in 1968) due to salary disputes.

In 2020, Byrd was posthumously inducted with the rest of the Famous Flames' members Baby Lloyd Stallworth, Bobby Bennett, and Johnny Terry into the National Rhythm and Blues Hall of Fame, some seven years after the induction of Flames lead singer James Brown into the same organization.

== See also ==
- Maceo Parker
- Fred Wesley
