= Just You and Me, Darling =

Single by James Brown and The Famous Flames

from the album The Amazing James Brown
- A-side: "I Love You, Yes I Do"
- Released: 1961
- Genre: Rhythm and blues
- Length: 2:37
- Label: King; 5547
- Songwriter(s): James Brown

James Brown charting singles chronology
"Baby, You're Right" (1961)	"Just You and Me, Darling" (1961)	"Lost Someone" (1961)

Audio video
- "Just You And Me Darling" on YouTube

"Just You and Me, Darling" is a song written by James Brown and recorded by Brown and The Famous Flames. Released as the B-side of Brown's 1961 cover of "I Love You Yes I Do", it charted #17 R&B. It also appeared on the album The Amazing James Brown.
