= Bobby Bennett (singer) =

American singer

- Also known as: Bobby
- Born: June 27, 1938; Burlington, North Carolina, US
- Died: January 18, 2013 (aged 74) Maryland, United States
- Genres: Soul; R&B
- Occupations: Singer; songwriter; choreographer; comedian; musician
- Years active: 1958–2013
- Labels: King; Loma
- Formerly of: James Brown; Baby Lloyd Stallworth; The Famous Flames; Johnny Terry; Bobby Byrd; Bobby Bennett & the Dynamics

Robert J. Bennett (June 27, 1938 – January 18, 2013) was an American singer, songwriter, choreographer, comedian, and musician, noted for being a member of the vocal group the Famous Flames from 1958 to 1968. During his time in the group, he served as a singer, songwriter, instrumentalist, comedian, emcee and dancer in the James Brown Revue. He was inducted into the Rock and Roll Hall of Fame as a member of the Famous Flames in 2012.

== Early life and education ==
Bobby Bennett was born Robert J. Bennett on June 27, 1938, in Burlington, North Carolina. The son of Robert and Inez Bennett, he was raised in Burlington's Rauhut Street in Alamance County, where it was called "Glencoe Road", and graduated from Jordan Sellars High School in 1957. According to his wife, Sandra, Bennett sang with the gospel group the Harmonizing Five and traveled with them locally and to many East Coast and southern states from Maryland, DC and Virginia all the way to Florida. Following graduation, Bennett received a four-year sports scholarship to attend A&T University in Greensboro. During his time in college, Bennett majored in Agricultural Studies.

In the spring of 1958, Bennett left college for a summer break, finding work in New Jersey to earn funds for the following school year. Following this, he visited New York to see his old friend, J. C. Davis whose band, The Bucket-Heads, was playing for James Brown and the Famous Flames at the Rocklin Place in New York City as Davis had become Brown's first bandleader. Bennett and Davis were school buddies who did shows together while attending high school. Bennett eventually became Davis' valet.

== Career ==
=== The Famous Flames ===
While attending the performance, Bennett found out from Davis that one of the Famous Flames, Robert Gram, was leaving the show to get married and wasn't going to return. Davis insisted that Bennett should try out for the position because Davis felt that Bennett had the voice and talent. Auditions started at the Teresa Hotel in New York City. Bennett beat out twenty other hopefuls to get the position and became a full-fledged member of the Famous Flames in 1958, causing Bennett to permanently drop out of college. During the time Bennett joined, James Brown had not yet established himself as a dominant force in music and was himself considered still just a member of the Famous Flames. Brown's manager, Ben Bart, had caused a rift in the original lineup of the group after suggesting the group perform under the "James Brown and The Famous Flames" billing following the success of their first hit, "Please, Please, Please". When Bennett joined, the Famous Flames consisted of Brown, "Baby Lloyd" Stallworth and Johnny Terry.

Founder Bobby Byrd, who had left in May 1957, wasn't a member at the time Bennett joined. Byrd's departure caused Brown to take control of the group, with the help of Ben Bart. Byrd would occasionally show up to mentor the act. Under Brown's insistence, Byrd rejoined the group as a member just before they were set to open for Little Willie John at their first appearance at The Apollo Theater on April 24, 1959. One of Bennett's first recordings as a Famous Flames member was with the song, "Good, Good Lovin'", which became a regional hit. Between 1960 and 1964, Bennett would participate in several hit recordings with the Flames including "Think", "Bewildered", "I Don't Mind", "Shout and Shimmy", "I'll Go Crazy", "Oh Baby Don't You Weep", "This Old Heart" and others. Despite the frequently incorrect crediting of James Brown as the sole artist on these songs, they were recorded and made hits by the entire group, "James Brown and the Famous Flames". Bennett, along with the other Famous Flames, also wrote or co-wrote several songs with the group. By the early 1960s, the Famous Flames had established themselves as the top-ranked R&B group of the time, both on record and on tour.

Following their success, it was suggested that the group record a live album. The group's explosive, high energy live performances across America rarely failed in bringing audiences to states of frenzy. Their tight harmonies and explosive dance routines increased their popularity as they performed in venues such as The Regal Theater in Chicago, The Royal Theatre in Baltimore, the Cleveland Arena in Cleveland, the Howard Theatre in Washington, D.C., and the Apollo in New York City. Despite King Records president Syd Nathan's protests that live albums didn't sell, Brown financed his own money to release the Live at the Apollo album in 1963, which eventually reached number 2 on the Billboard Pop Album Chart, and sold over a million copies, a feat unprecedented for a R&B album at that time. Like most of the material featuring the Famous Flames, they weren't credited with Brown on this album (but they were included in the album's intro by Fats Gonder), though later reissues in the CD era would credit the group alongside Brown later on. The group started experiencing mainstream success following the Apollo album and by 1965 had appeared in TV shows such as The Ed Sullivan Show, the Dick Clark-hosted shows, American Bandstand and Where the Action Is and other shows, both nationally and regionally. The group also began touring globally, performing in venues such as The Olympia in Paris, Royal Albert Hall in London and also appeared on the UK music show Ready Steady Go! The group's popularity had become so massive that Bennett later said they couldn't leave their hotels to go sightseeing because "we were getting mobbed by people".

The group also appeared in two Hollywood motion pictures, The T.A.M.I. Show, which was a 1964 All-Star concert film, taped at the Santa Monica Civic Auditorium on October 28 and 29, 1964, in which the group upstaged headliners the Rolling Stones; and 1965's Ski Party, a Frankie Avalon vehicle in which James Brown and the Flames were humorously cast as the "white bread" resort's all-black ski patrol. Both features were filmed by American International Pictures . Bennett contributed along with James and the other Flames on more hit live albums including the Billboard Top 10 Pop hit album Pure Dynamite! Live at the Royal, where Bennett was responsible for the group's comedic stage routines, and James Brown and the Famous Flames Live at the Garden, though the actual show was at Cherry Hill's Latin Casino. Bennett also contributed to studio albums such as Think! and Showtime. The group's last studio recording with Brown was "Maybe the Last Time", released as the b-side to Brown's rock'n'roll hit, "Out of Sight" in 1964. In addition to recording for King Records, Bennett (and fellow Famous Flame "Baby Lloyd" Stallworth) also recorded several solo James Brown-produced singles for other labels, including the now defunct Loma Records, a subsidiary of Warner Bros. Records, where he recorded "Soul Jerk Pts. 1 & 2", under the billing, Bobby Bennett & the Dynamics.

As the group's fortunes increased, however, James Brown began to think in terms of solo success, apart from the Flames, helping to bring dissension within the group, which Bennett confirmed in an interview with the Cleveland Plain Dealer in 2012. Bennett noted the change, stating, "in the beginning, we all rode around in a station wagon, with each of us taking turns doing the driving." As the success grew, their mode of transportation changed. While some of the members had moved up to bus, Brown rode around in either by a Cadillac or a Learjet; Bennett noted this as being "the beginning of the separation of James Brown and the Famous Flames". The group's label, King Records, was of no help as they only posted Brown's image on the covers of their albums instead of the entire group, and also failed to sometimes mention the group's name in covers they did appear in, including the Pure Dynamite and Showtime albums. Brown had also taken control of the group's finances, allegedly taking the lion's share of profits from live performances and studio recordings for himself, while the rest of the group was put under a salary. When the other Flames balked at this process, Brown responded by using them less on his records, later stating that they "couldn't sing well". The Famous Flames continued to back Brown until further arguments over monies and royalties and the stress of being on the road led to Lloyd Stallworth walking out first in 1966 . Bennett also eventually left the James Brown Show in 1968. With their name on several releases between 1965 and 1968, but no Flames singing on record, much of the public, who had never seen the group perform live, mistakenly believed that the Famous Flames were Brown's band, instead of the vocal group they actually were. The last single in which the Famous Flames received label credit was "Licking Stick" (King 6166) in 1968. Only Byrd participated in the recording with Brown, beginning a period in which the duo sung duets on several hits including "Get Up (I Feel Like Being a) Sex Machine", "Soul Power", "Make It Funky", "Talkin' Loud and Sayin' Nothing" and "Get Up, Get into It, Get Involved". Byrd didn't receive label credit on these songs. Because of this and other reasons, mainly financial disputes, Famous Flames founder, Bobby Byrd too, finally left for good in 1973.

== Rock and Roll Hall of Fame ==
On April 14, 2012, Bennett was inducted retroactively with the rest of The Famous Flames, into the Rock and Roll Hall of Fame. When the group's lead singer, James Brown, was inducted into the Hall of Fame's inaugural class in 1986, the other members of his group, Famous Flames members Bennett, Bobby Byrd, Johnny Terry, and Lloyd Stallworth, were not inducted. This caused a 26-year controversy, and puzzled many of the group's fans. Finally, in 2012, The Rock and Roll Hall of Fame formed a special committee to discuss certain deserving pioneering groups that were not inducted with their lead singers in the Hall of Fame's initial years of inductions. As a result of this committee's decision, the Famous Flames, including Bennett, were one of the six groups automatically inducted into the Hall of Fame, without the need for nomination and voting, under the premise that they should have been inducted with James Brown back in 1986. Bennett, the sole surviving member of the Famous Flames at age 74, accepted on behalf of the group.

In an interview with the Rock Hall on the eve of the Flames' induction, Bennett said: "James (Brown) was a Flame. Bobby Byrd was a Flame. Lloyd Stallworth was a Flame, and Bobby Bennett (who's still here), was a Famous Flame also." "We performed all over the world. "We were the best out there: best dancers, best singers, we were good". Everyone else opened for us: The O'Jays, Four Tops, Temptations, Smokey Robinson & The Miracles, Gladys Knight and The Pips, Patti La Belle (and The Bluebelles). Everybody has worked with James Brown and The Famous Flames. We were the stars of every show that was out there".

The Rock and Roll Hall of Fame awarded Bobby Bennett, and the other members of the Famous Flames, Bobby Byrd, Lloyd Stallworth, and Johnny Terry, posthumously on April 14, 2012.

In a 2012 interview with Goldmine, Bennett, said:

I want (people) to know one thing ... We were the Famous Flames... James Brown was a Famous Flame, Bobby Byrd was a Famous Flame, Lloyd Stallworth was a Famous Flame and Bobby Bennett was a Famous Flame ... wherever we played, we were the Famous Flames. We were never the band, never. We were the 3 guys who danced (and sang) with him and the 3 guys who performed with him at every concert. We were not no 'band'. We were the group that worked hard on stage and did a wonderful performance on stage for the whole public.

Bobby's statement about the Famous Flames being a singing group and not "backup musicians" was also confirmed by Flames lead singer James Brown in a 1982 interview on The David Letterman Show.

== Death ==
Bennett died at his home in Maryland on January 18, 2013, of complications of diabetes, less than one year after the group's Rock and Roll Hall of Fame induction. Ten days later, on January 28, 2013, The Rock and Roll Hall of Fame website issued an article paying tribute to him. He is survived by his wife of many years, Sandi, and their children.

== Legacy ==
Actor and choreographer Aakomon Jones played Bennett in the 2014 James Brown biofilm Get On Up. He also served as choreographer for the film.

In 2020, Bobby Bennett was posthumously inducted with the rest of the Famous Flames' members Baby Lloyd Stallworth, Bobby Byrd, and Johnny Terry into the National Rhythm and Blues Hall of Fame, some seven years after the induction of Flames lead singer James Brown into the same organization.
