= Think (The "5" Royales song) =

1957 single by The "5" Royales

Single by The "5" Royales
- B-side: "I'd Better Make a Move"
- Released: 1957
- Recorded: 1957
- Genre: Rhythm and blues
- Length: 2:35
- Label: King; 5053
- Songwriter(s): Lowman Pauling

The "5" Royales singles chronology
"Thirty Second Lover" (1957)	"Think" (1957)	"Messin' Up" (1957)

"Think"

Single by James Brown and the Famous Flames

from the album Think!
- B-side: "You've Got the Power"
- Released: May 1960
- Recorded: February 20, 1960, United Studios, Hollywood, CA
- Genre: Rhythm and blues
- Length: 2:46
- Label: Federal; 12370
- Songwriter(s): Lowman Pauling
- Producer(s): Unknown

James Brown charting singles chronology
"I'll Go Crazy" (1960)	"Think" (1960)	""You've Got the Power" (B-side of "Think")" (1960)

Audio video
- "Think" on YouTube

"Think"

Single by Vicki Anderson and James Brown

from the album Live at the Apollo, Volume II
- B-side: "Nobody Cares" (Vicki Anderson only)
- Released: 1967
- Genre: Soul, funk
- Length: 3:22
- Label: King; 6091
- Songwriter(s): Lowman Pauling
- Producer(s): James Brown

James Brown charting singles chronology
"Kansas City" (1967)	"Think" (1967)	"Let Yourself Go" (1967)

"Think"

Single by James Brown
- B-side: "Something"
- Released: April 1973
- Genre: Funk
- Length: 3:14
- Label: Polydor; 14177
- Songwriter(s): Lowman Pauling
- Producer(s): James Brown

James Brown charting singles chronology
"The Boss" (1973)	"Think" (1973)	"Think" (1973)

"Think"

Single by James Brown
- B-side: "Something"
- Released: June 1973
- Genre: Funk
- Length: 3:18
- Label: Polydor; 14185
- Songwriter(s): Lowman Pauling
- Producer(s): James Brown

James Brown charting singles chronology
"Think" (1973)	"Think" (1973)	"Sexy, Sexy, Sexy" (1973)

"Think" is a rhythm and blues song written by Lowman Pauling and originally recorded by his group the "5" Royales. Released as a single on King Records in 1957, it was a national hit and reached number nine on the U.S. R&B chart.

== James Brown & the Famous Flames version ==
In 1960, James Brown and the Famous Flames recorded a cover version of "Think". The song's instrumental backing featured a pronounced rhythmic attack that anticipated Brown's later funk music. Critic Peter Guralnick described Brown's version of the song as a "radical reworking... Sung rapid-fire with the kind of sharp prompting from the Famous Flames that was the aural equivalent of their precision steps, 'Think' embodied an approach different from any in the past, with not only the song but the structure of the song turned inside out and a classic shuffle blues rhythmically and melodically transformed." Douglas Wolk called it "[Brown's] first great dance record."

"Think" was released as a single on the King Records subsidiary label Federal Records and charted #7 R&B and #33 pop in June 1960, staying on the latter chart for eight weeks. ("Think"'s B-side, "You've Got the Power", was also a hit, reaching #14 R&B and #86 pop, the latter song only spending a week on the chart.) It was Brown and the Famous Flames' first recording to enter the Pop top 40, and their next-to-last single for the Federal label before they switched to King. "Think" was also included on Brown's 1960 album of the same name.

=== Personnel ===
- James Brown – lead vocal

and the Famous Flames:

- Bobby Byrd – vocals
- Bobby Bennett – vocals
- Baby Lloyd Stallworth – vocals
- Bill Hollings – vocals
- Johnny Terry – vocals

with the James Brown Band

- Alfred Corley – alto saxophone
- J.C. Davis – tenor saxophone
- Bobby Roach – guitar
- Bernard Odum – bass guitar
- Nat Kendrick – drums

=== Other James Brown versions ===
James Brown & the Famous Flames recorded an extremely fast live rendition of "Think" for their 1963 album Live at the Apollo. Brown also performs the song on Live at the Apollo, Volume II in a duet with Marva Whitney.

In 1967, Brown recorded "Think" in the studio as a duet with Vicki Anderson. The version grazed the bottom of the Pop chart, peaking at #100. Brown returned to "Think" again in 1973, when he released two different solo performances of the song as singles on the Polydor label, both of them backed with his cover of the Beatles' "Something". Both versions charted, the former at #15 R&B and #77 Pop, the latter at #37 R&B and #80 Pop.

== Other cover versions ==
- Bobby John of the Kings of Rhythm covered the song which was released on Ike & Tina Turner's 1964 album Revue Live.
- Mick Jagger covered "Think" on his 1993 solo album Wandering Spirit.
- People! covered the song on their 1969 album Both Sides of People and again on Best of People! Vol. 2 (2006).
- Booker T. & the M.G.'s recorded an instrumental version of the song for their 1966 album And Now!.
- Linn County covered the James Brown version of the song on the 1968 album, Proud Flesh Soothseer.
