= I Know You Got Soul (Bobby Byrd song) =

Single by Bobby Byrd

from the album James Brown's Funky People Part 2
- B-side: "It's I Who Love You (Not Him Anymore)"
- Released: May 1971
- Genre: Soul, funk
- Length: 3:00
- Label: King; 6378
- Songwriter(s): James Brown; Charles Bobbitt; Bobby Byrd
- Producer(s): James Brown

Audio video
- "I Know You Got Soul" on YouTube

"I Know You Got Soul" is a song recorded by Bobby Byrd with James Brown's band The J.B.'s. The recording was produced by Brown and released as a single in 1971. It reached #30 on the Billboard R&B chart. It was prominently sampled on the 1987 song of the same name by Eric B. & Rakim. The "you got it" is referenced in Static and in the song's remix.

An extended 4:42 version was issued on the James Brown's Funky People (Part 2) compilation album in 1988, with a notation that the long version was previously unreleased.

"I Know You Got Soul" appeared on the Grand Theft Auto: San Andreas soundtrack on the Master Sounds 98.3 station.

== Sampled in ==
- Eric B & Rakim - I Know You Got Soul
- James Brown - Static
- Public Enemy - Fight The Power
- DJ DSK & Mystro - I Know You Got Sole
