= Live at the Apollo (1963 album) =

Live album by James Brown and the Famous Flames
- Released: May 1963
- Recorded: October 24, 1962
- Venue: Apollo Theater in Harlem
- Genres: R&B; soul
- Length: 31:31
- Label: King (Catalog number K-826)
- Producers: James Brown (original); Harry Weinger (Polydor reissues)

James Brown live albums chronology
Live at the Apollo (1963)	Pure Dynamite! Live at the Royal (1964)

Live at the Apollo is the first live album by James Brown and the Famous Flames, recorded at the Apollo Theater in Harlem in October 1962 and released in May 1963 by King Records. Capturing Brown's popular stage show for the first time on record, the album was a major commercial success, was critically acclaimed, and cemented his status as a leading R&B star. It is also widely famous for its incredibly loud, piercing crowd noise and intense audience reactions, especially during the slower ballad medleys.

The album is included in Robert Christgau's "Basic Record Library" of 1950s and 1960s recordings, published in Christgau's Record Guide: Rock Albums of the Seventies (1981). In 2000 it was voted number 248 in Colin Larkin's All Time Top 1000 Albums. In 2003, the album was ranked number 24 on Rolling Stone magazine's list of The 500 Greatest Albums of All Time, then was re-ranked at number 25 in 2012, and then re-ranked at number 65 in a 2020 reboot of the list. In 2004, it was one of 50 recordings chosen that year by the Library of Congress to be added to the National Recording Registry. In 1998, the album was inducted into the Grammy Hall of Fame.

== Background ==
The album was recorded on the night of October 24, 1962, at Brown's own expense. (Note: King Records owner Syd Nathan refused to fund the recording, thinking it would not be commercially profitable.) Although not credited on the album cover or label, Brown's vocal group, The Famous Flames (Bobby Byrd, Bobby Bennett, and Lloyd Stallworth), played an important co-starring role in Live at the Apollo, and are included with Brown by MC Fats Gonder in the album's intro. It wasn't until the CD release of this album, decades later, that The Flames were finally credited for their work on this album. While Brown's record label, King Records, originally opposed releasing the album, believing that a live album featuring no new songs would not be profitable, the label finally relented under pressure from both Brown's manager Bud Hobgood and Brown himself.

== Release and reception ==
Professional ratings
Review scores
Source	Rating
AllMusic	5/5 stars
BBC Music	favorable
Blender	5/5 stars
Entertainment Weekly	A+
Mojo	5/5 stars
Pitchfork Media	10/10
PopMatters	10/10
Rolling Stone	5/5 stars
Encyclopedia of Popular Music	5/5 stars
Yahoo! Music	favorable

Live at the Apollo was an amazingly rapid seller. It spent 66 weeks on the Billboard Top Pop Albums chart, peaking at #2. Many record stores, especially in the southeast US, found themselves unable to keep up with the demand for the product, eventually ordering several cases at a time. R&B DJs often would play side 1 in its entirety, pausing only to insert commercials and to flip the record to side 2, (Note: ... as side 1 ends in the middle of the long track "Lost Someone".) which was often played in full as well.

== Legacy ==
In a retrospective article for Rolling Stone, music critic Robert Christgau said that Brown was a "striking but more conventional performer" in the show than on his contemporary studio recordings and wrote of the album:

Recorded in 1962 and barely half an hour long, it lacks the heft we associate with live albums, relegating major songs to the same eight-title medley as forgettable ones. But not only did it establish Brown as an r&b superstar and a sales force to be reckoned with, it's a time capsule, living testament of a chitlin circuit now defunct. The band is clean as a silk suit, and how the women love this rough singer's tender lover-in-song act. There is no music anywhere quite like the perfectly timed and articulated female fan-screeches that punctuate the 10-minute 'Lost Someone.'

Brown went on to record several more albums at the Apollo throughout his career, including 1968's Live at the Apollo, Volume II (King), 1971's Revolution of the Mind: Live at the Apollo, Volume III (Polydor), and Live at the Apollo 1995 (Scotti Bros.).

In 2015, Rolling Stone listed it as the greatest live album of all time.

MC5 guitarist Wayne Kramer cited Live at the Apollo as the inspiration to Kick Out the Jams. "Our whole thing was based on James Brown. We listened to Live at the Apollo endlessly on acid. We would listen to that in the van in the early days of 8-tracks on the way to the gigs to get us up for the gig. If you played in a band in Detroit in the days before The MC5, everybody did 'Please, Please, Please' and 'I Go Crazy.' These were standards. We modeled The MC5's performance on those records. Everything we did was on a gut level about sweat and energy. It was anti-refinement. That's what we were consciously going for."

== CD reissues ==
Despite its renowned and historical significance, Live at the Apollo was not reissued on CD until 1990 because the original master recordings had been misplaced and the available copies were not of a high enough quality for a satisfactory CD release. The master tapes were recovered in late 1989. As Harry Weinger writes in the booklet of the reissued Deluxe Edition (featuring remastered sound and several alternate mixes) in 2004: "Finding the primary master, not the readily available copy, became a mission. It was tough to find, since the original LP didn't index individual tracks, meaning its song titles would not be properly listed in a database. The tape vault was 100,000 reels strong, and growing. As JB would say Good gawd. I shared this tale of woe with Phil Schaap, the noted jazz historian. One day, [as] Philip was searching the vault for a Max Roach tape, his hand landed on what he thought was Max's master. Pulling the tape off the shelf, he realized he had instead an anonymous-looking audiotape box that said: 'Second Show James Brown'. It was initialed, in grease pencil, 'GR-CLS-King Records' (Gene Redd and Chuck L. Speitz). Phil handed it to me, saying with urgent economy, 'I think you need to hear this."

== Track listing ==
The track listing is as it appears on the 2004 remaster. The original 1963 issue of the album is unindexed.

No.	Title	Length
1.	"Introduction to James Brown and The Famous Flames" (by Fats Gonder)	1:49
2.	"I'll Go Crazy"	2:05
3.	"Try Me"	2:27
4.	"Think"	1:58
5.	"I Don't Mind"	2:28
6.	"Lost Someone"	10:43
7.	"Medley: Please, Please, Please/You've Got the Power/I Found Someone/Why Do You Do Me/I Want You So Bad/I Love You, Yes I Do/Strange Things Happen/Bewildered/Please, Please, Please"	6:27
8.	"Night Train"	3:26

2004 Deluxe Edition bonus tracks
No.	Title	Length
9.	"Think" (Single Mix, Radio Promo Version)	2:01
10.	"Medley: I Found Someone/Why Do You Do Me/I Want You So Bad" (Single Mix)	2:10
11.	"Lost Someone" (Single Mix)	2:43
12.	"I'll Go Crazy" (Single Mix)	2:18

== Personnel ==
=== James Brown & The Famous Flames ===
- James Brown – lead vocals
- Bobby Byrd – baritone/bass vocals (and keyboards on "Lost Someone")
- Bobby Bennett – first tenor vocals
- Lloyd Stallworth – second tenor vocals

=== Band ===
- Lewis Hamlin – music director, trumpet
- Hubert Perry – bass
- Clayton Fillyau – drums
- Les Buie – guitar, road manager
- Lucas "Fats" Gonder – organ, MC
- Clifford MacMillan – tenor saxophone
- St. Clair Pinckney – tenor saxophone
- Al "Brisco" Clark – tenor saxophone, baritone saxophone
- William Burgess – alto saxophone
- Dickie Wells – trombone
- Roscoe Patrick – trumpet
- Teddy Washington – trumpet
- Sam Lathan - drums

=== Technical ===
- Dan Quest – art and cover (original LP)
- Hal Neely – liner notes (original sleeve)
- Tom Nola – location engineer
- Chuck Seitz – editing, mastering (original LP)
- Gene Redd – editing (original LP)
- James Brown – producer
