= Vicki Anderson =

American soul singer (1939–2023)

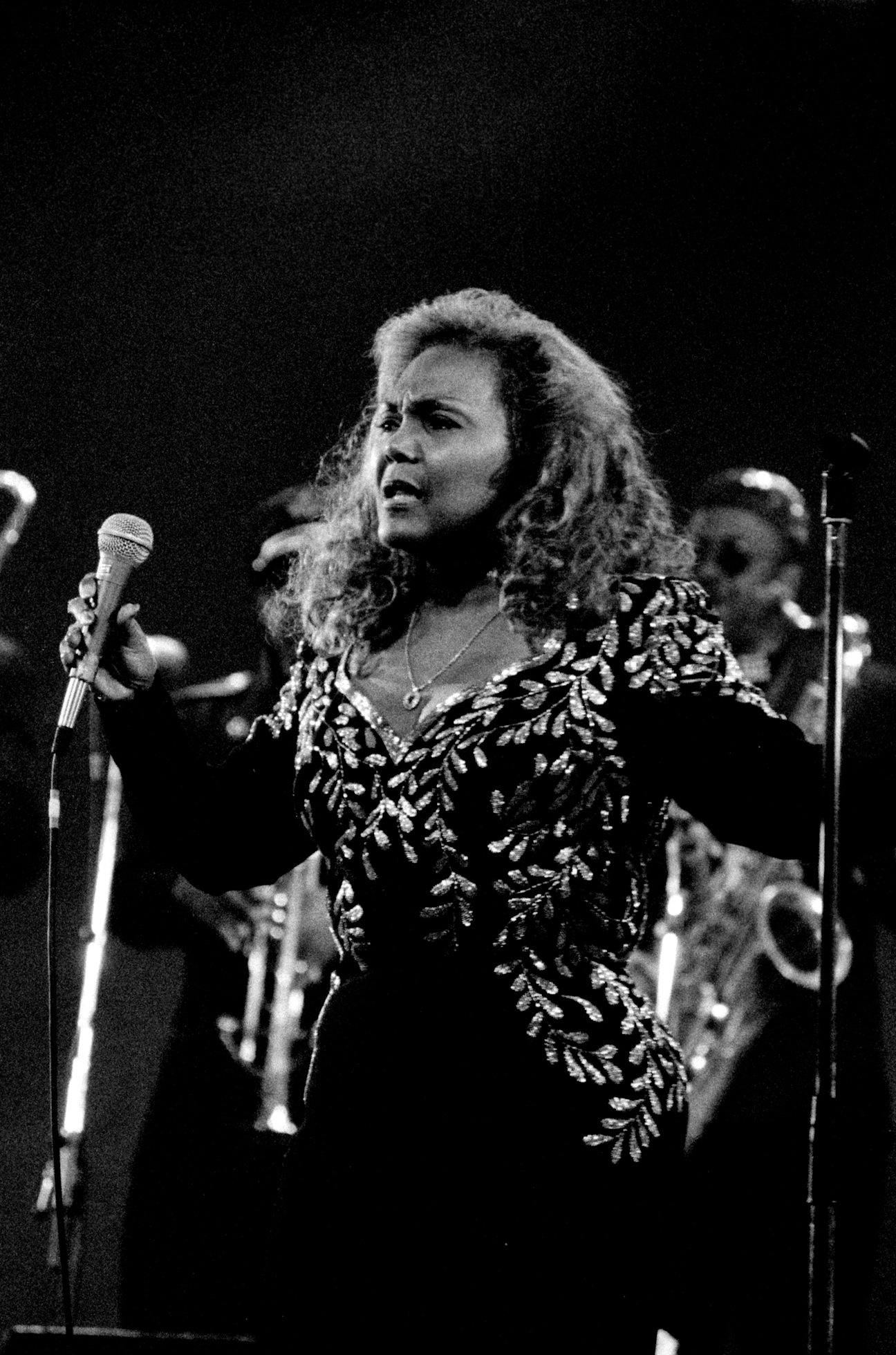
- Anderson performing in 1998

Background information
- Birth name: Myra Barnes
- Born: November 21, 1939; Houston, Texas, U.S.
- Died: July 3, 2023 (aged 83); Rex, Georgia, U.S.
- Genres: Soul, funk, R&B
- Occupation(s): Musician, singer
- Instrument: Vocals
- Years active: 1965–1995
- Formerly of: James Brown Revue

Vicki Anderson (born Myra Barnes; November 21, 1939 – July 3, 2023) was an American soul singer best known for her performances with the James Brown Revue. She recorded a number of singles under both her birth and stage names. She was the widow of Bobby Byrd and mother of musician Carleen Anderson.

== Life and career ==
Myra Barnes was born in Houston, Texas. She joined Brown in 1965, replacing Anna King, and stayed for three years as his main female singer, until she was replaced by Marva Whitney in 1968. She rejoined in 1969 after Marva departed, staying for a further three years until 1972, after which Lyn Collins took over from her. Brown claimed in his autobiography that Anderson was the best singer he ever had in his revue.

In 1970, she released the funk song "The Message from the Soul Sisters". A single on James' I-Dentify label by Momie-O appeared in 1975 featuring a cover of Rufus' hit "Once You Get Started" and Bobby Womack's "Stop On By". Anderson toured the UK with the James Brown Funky People Revue in the late 1980s and again with husband Bobby Byrd, the founder of The Famous Flames, in the mid-1990s.

Anderson married Byrd in the mid-1960s, and was the mother of UK-based Carleen, who released albums from the 1990s.

Anderson died on July 3, 2023, at the age of 83.

== See also ==
- Marva Whitney
- Yvonne Fair
