= I'll Go Crazy (James Brown song) =

1960 Rhythm and blues song

Single by James Brown and The Famous Flames

from the album Think!
- B-side: "I Know It's True"
- Released: 1960
- Recorded: 1959
- Studio: King Studios, Cincinnati, OH
- Genre: Rhythm and blues
- Length: 2:05
- Label: Federal; 12369
- Songwriter: James Brown
- Producer: Unknown

James Brown charting singles chronology
| "Good Good Lovin'" (1960) | "I'll Go Crazy" (1960) | "Think" (1960) |

Audio video
- "I'll Go Crazy" on YouTube

"I'll Go Crazy"

Single by James Brown and The Famous Flames

from the album Live at the Apollo
- A-side: "Lost Someone"
- Released: January 1966
- Recorded: October 24, 1962, Apollo Theater, New York, NY
- Genre: Rhythm and blues
- Length: 2:10
- Label: King; 6020
- Songwriter: James Brown
- Producer: James Brown

James Brown charting singles chronology
| "Lost Someone" (1966) | "I'll Go Crazy" (1966) | "Ain't That a Groove Part 1" (1966) |

"I'll Go Crazy" is a rhythm and blues song recorded by James Brown and The Famous Flames. Released as a single in 1960, it was Brown's fourth R&B hit, charting at #15. Brown and the Flames also performed it as the first song on their 1963 album Live at the Apollo.

The Live at the Apollo performance of "I'll Go Crazy" was also later released as the B-side of a single in 1966, backed with "Lost Someone" (also from the live album). It charted #38 R&B and #73 Pop.This live version was the last song featuring The Famous Flames to chart.

== Personnel ==
- James Brown – lead vocal

and the Famous Flames:

- Bobby Byrd – vocals
- Bobby Bennett – vocals
- Baby Lloyd Stallworth - vocals
- Johnny Terry – vocals
- Willie Johnson – vocals

with the James Brown Band:

- J.C. Davis – tenor saxophone
- Bobby Roach – guitar
- Bernard Odum – bass guitar
- Nat Kendrick – drums

plus:

- Sonny Thompson – piano
- James McGary – alto saxophone

== Chart performance ==
| Chart (1960) | Peak position |
|---|---|
| US Hot R&B Sides (Billboard) | 15 |

| Chart (1966) | Peak position |
|---|---|
| US Billboard Hot 100 | 73 |
| US Top Selling Rhythm & Blues Singles (Billboard) | 38 |

== Cover versions ==
"I'll Go Crazy" has inspired cover versions by many different artists, including:

- Tommy James and the Shondells released a cover version of the song on their debut album, Hanky Panky.
- The Rolling Stones
- The Kingsmen
- The Blues Magoos
- The Residents
- The Moody Blues
- The Buckinghams
- Chris Isaak
- Jerry Garcia and David Grisman
- Buddy Guy
- The Nighthawks
- Tommy Quickly
- Graham Bonnet
- Delfini
- The Honeycombs live in Tokyo
- Clarence Clemons.

James himself would re-record the song for his 1981 album Nonstop!.

== Popular culture ==
- It was performed by Dan Aykroyd in the actor's tribute to Brown on his induction at the 2003 Kennedy Center Honors.
- This song was used on the Late Show with David Letterman as theme music for the "Who Said It?" segment.
