= Baby Lloyd Stallworth =

American soul singer

Lloyd Stallworth
- Also known as: Baby Lloyd
- Born: Lloyd Eugene Stallworth; April 15, 1941
- Origin: Tampa, Florida, US
- Died: October 27, 2002 (aged 61)
- Genres: Soul, R&B
- Occupations: Singer, songwriter, musician, choreographer, dancer
- Years active: 1957–1990
- Labels: King Records, Loma Records, Smash Records, Atco Records
- Formerly of: The Famous Flames
- Website: Famous Flames website

Lloyd Eugene Stallworth (April 15, 1941 – October 27, 2002), also known as Baby Lloyd, was an American singer, songwriter, musician, recording artist, choreographer and dancer who was a member of the R&B vocal group The Famous Flames on King Records from 1958 to 1967. Stallworth was posthumously inducted into the Rock and Roll Hall of Fame in 2012 as a member of The Famous Flames.

== Biography ==
Stallworth was born in Fort Lauderdale, Florida, in 1941. In 1957, he was employed by James Brown as his valet and part-time driver. Stallworth's mother arranged the job in order to keep her son 'out of trouble'.

=== Performances ===
Stallworth sang with the group on several hit singles, including "Bewildered", "Good Good Lovin'", "This Old Heart", "I Don't Mind", "Think", "I'll Go Crazy", "Three Hearts in a Tangle", and "Oh Baby Don't You Weep" and co-wrote Brown's 1961 hit, "Lost Someone". He recorded several albums with the group, including the million-selling Top 10 album "Live at The Apollo" (1963). Other albums included Pure Dynamite! Live at the Royal (another Billboard Top 10 success), Think, Showtime, and James Brown and The Famous Flames Live at the Garden. Stallworth performed solo spots in Brown's revue as an opening act and recorded a couple of Brown-produced solo songs.

As an artist in his own right, Stallworth released just a handful of singles: "I Need You" for Dade/Atco Records (1960) and "There's Something on Your Mind" for Loma Records (2014). He also recorded a single for the small Hollywood-based "Wolfie" label, entitled "I Refuse To Cry" (W-101) and made an appearance on the Smash Records live album, Presenting...The James Brown Show (SRS-67087-1967) where he, along with several James Brown Revue artists, including Vicki Anderson, sang two songs. One of them was "(I Can't Get No) Satisfaction".

Stallworth appeared with James Brown and The Famous Flames in the 1964 American International Pictures concert film The T.A.M.I. Show, recorded live at the Santa Monica Civic Auditorium, where they upstaged headliners The Rolling Stones. He also appeared with the group in the Frankie Avalon film, Ski Party (1965), and on a 1966 telecast of The Ed Sullivan Show on CBS .

In 1966, James Brown made two appearances on The Ed Sullivan Show, both with The Famous Flames. Stallworth was with the group on the first appearance (May 1, 1966), but he left the group before the second (October 30, 1966). Only Brown was given billing or payment (the group members were salaried) and this caused discord within the group.

== Litigation ==
In 2002, along with band member Fred Wesley, Famous Flames Stallworth, Bobby Byrd, and Bobby Bennett retained Richard Yellen, an attorney, to begin legal proceedings against James Brown for alleged non-payment of royalties. The lawsuit was filed in the New York state supreme court on October 31, 2002, and then in the Manhattan federal court. Baby Lloyd and Bobby Bennett sought $7 million, Byrd $5 million (and $2 million for his wife, singer Vicki (Anderson) Byrd) as royalties from the 1960s and 1970s. The lawsuit was dismissed because the statute of limitations had expired.

== Rock and Roll Hall of Fame controversy ==
In 1986, James Brown was inducted as one of the charter members of The Rock and Roll Hall of Fame without The Famous Flames. This led to long lasting controversy over the following 27 years.

In 2011, eleven years after Stallworth's death, five years after Bobby Byrd's death, and seven years after John Terry's death, Terry Stewart, the chief executive officer of the Rock and Roll Hall of Fame, formed a Special Committee to consider the bands and groups that had been eligible for induction, but were left out because of the impact of their lead singers or front men. Concerning the omission of the Flames when Brown was inducted alone in 1986, Stewart said, "There was no legislative intent [as to] why they (the Famous Flames) weren't included; somehow, they just got overlooked."

The Famous Flames (Byrd, Bennett, Terry and Stallworth) received their induction in Cleveland, on April 14, 2012. Bennett, who died the following year, (January 18, 2013), as the group's only surviving member, accepted the induction on behalf of The Famous Flames. At the same time, The Midnighters (Hank Ballard), The Comets (Bill Haley), The Crickets (Buddy Holly), The Blue Caps (Gene Vincent) and The Miracles (Smokey Robinson), received their induction, Miracles lead singer Smokey Robinson, who inducted all six groups, including his own Miracles, said,

"These people do not stand behind you. They stand with you." "These are not backing groups. These are the groups."

and;

"If James Brown was the hardest working man in show business, The Famous Flames were the hardest working group."

== Legacy ==
King Records never put The Famous Flames' faces on any of their album covers (only Brown was pictured). This limited their future market potential. For a short time, after leaving The Famous Flames, Stallworth took a position as a member of James Brown's clerical staff. Stallworth died in 2002, at the age of 61, from complications of diabetes. (Some sources report 2001 as his year of death).

Choreographer Codie Wiggins played Famous Flame "Baby Lloyd" Stallworth (in an uncredited role) in the 2014 biopic, "Get on Up" that was released in theatres nationwide on August 1, 2014. In 2020, "Baby Lloyd" Stallworth was posthumously inducted as a member of The Famous Flames into the National Rhythm & Blues Hall of Fame, following James Brown seven years prior.
