= I Don't Mind (James Brown song) =

1961 single performed by James Brown and The Famous Flames

Single by James Brown and the Famous Flames

from the album The Amazing James Brown
- B-side: "Love Don't Love Nobody"
- Released: May 1961
- Recorded: September 27, 1960
- Genre: Soul
- Length: 2:41
- Label: King
- Songwriter: James Brown
- Producer: Gene Redd

James Brown and the Famous Flames singles chronology
"Bewildered" (1961)	"I Don't Mind" (1961)	"Baby You're Right" (1961)

Audio video
- "I Don't Mind" on YouTube

"I Don't Mind" is a rhythm and blues song written by James Brown and performed by Brown and the Famous Flames. Released as a single in 1961, it reached number four in the R&B Billboard charts and number 47 in the Pop Billboard charts. Brown and the Flames also performed it on their 1963 album Live at the Apollo

A cover by the Who for their 1965 album My Generation led to the track gaining wider attention, being covered by other British Invasion groups at the same time.

== Background ==
Brown recorded "I Don't Mind" on September 27, 1960 together with the Famous Flames. On the track, guitarist Les Buie came in on his guitar solo a few notes early, and instead of doing a retake or something similar, Brown liked the take so much he decided to keep it, and has been replicated on multiple occasions during live performances of the song. According to author Douglas Wolk, the band seems to have problems recording the song, as they can be heard "adjusting their notes moment by moment." Its unusual chord progression – in Brown's words, it "opens with a 13, goes down to a C9, then goes to a G7 and to the A7" – prompted objections during the recording session from producer Gene Redd, who considered it musically "wrong". This led to Brown threatening not to record the song if he didn't get it his way, to which Redd eventually agreed on despite his earlier objections to it.

If you could hear it you'd know it was right. I can hear it, and I'm telling you it's right. And that's the way were gonna record it, or were not recording it at all.

— Bruce Tucker, James Brown, James Brown: The Godfather of Soul pg 121

== Chart positions ==
Chart (1961)	Peak position
U.S. Billboard R&B	4
U.S. Billboard Pop	47

== The Who version ==
"I Don't Mind"

Song by the Who

from the album My Generation
- Released: December 3, 1965
- Recorded: April 12, 1965
- Studio: IBC Studios, London
- Genre: Rhythm and blues
- Length: 2:36
- Label: Brunswick
- Songwriter: Brown
- Producer: Shel Talmy

=== Background and composition ===
"I Don't Mind" was later covered by English rock band the Who, who recorded it for their debut studio album My Generation in 1965. The reason behind recording the song most likely stems from lead singer Roger Daltrey's passion for Brown, whom he admired. In retrospect it was revealed that Daltrey's favorite song from Brown was "I Don't Mind". It was one of three songs by Brown they recorded during this era, the others being "Shout and Shimmy" which appeared as the B-side to their hit single "My Generation", and "Please, Please, Please" which also ended up on My Generation. First played live in 1964, the three songs were all part of the Who's repertoire during this time as well, only being dropped after they had written enough original material for their stage act during mid 1966. The song was recorded on April 12, 1965 at IBC Studios during a three-day recording session at the studio which also produced the other Brown covers.

The song opens with guitarist Pete Townshend strumming the C7 chord six times, while backed by both bassist John Entwistle and drummer Keith Moon. This differs from the original version, which opens with a 13 played on a piano. According to writer Mike Segretto, it was one of the Who's earliest attempts at rhythm and blues, a stint which was quickly ruined by Moon "flopping" on the beat of the song. John Atkins states that their cover of the song is "competent" but that it differens much from the rest of the album in tempo. He states that the piano by studio musician Nicky Hopkins is conventional and ungainly but that it's "effective enough without adding anything further to the song. Bob Carruthers however, believes that Hopkins piano playing is "the glue that holds everything together" and praises it compared with the rest of the backing artists. Atkins notes that Townshend's guitar solo on the song is more conventional, rather than utilising his power chord style of playing, but that the second guitar solo near the fade out doesn't improve the song.

=== Release and reception ===
My Generation was released on December 3, 1965, where "I Don't Mind" was only one of three covers songs on. The album received relatively good reviews, where in a Melody Maker review it is stated that Entwistle and Moon's playing are in top-form. Townshend himself reviewed the song in an issue of Record Mirror, stating "This was gonna be on our first LP which never came out. It's just a straight copy, well the best we could do of a James Brown number. It sounds better the way we do it now." Jed Gottlieb stated that "I Don't Mind" ranked among the more underrated Who songs. He notes the playing by Hopkins and states his like towards the combination of soul and rhythm and blues in mod style Bryan Wawzenek of the same site put the song at 183 on his list of the Who songs ranked, writing that the song is a "prosaic rendition of James Brown's ditty", negatively noting the out of tune backing vocals. Atkins negatively reviewed the song, stating that it slowed down the pace of the record which "thankfully got reinstated" by the following track "The Good's Gone". Carruthers calls it a trudging cover missing "heft and muscle" and key characteristics of Entwistle's and Moon's playing.

Apparently, the song was recorded during their BBC Sessions on May 10, 1965 but was however dismissed. The full length version, two minutes longer than the album cut, was released on a deluxe box set of My Generation in 2016.

=== Personnel ===
- Roger Daltrey – lead vocals
- Pete Townshend – guitar, backing vocals
- John Entwistle – bass guitar, backing vocals
- Keith Moon – drums
- Nicky Hopkins – piano

== Other cover versions ==
- The In Crowd with vocalist Keith West (1965 as the B-side of their 1965 single "Why Must They Criticise" (available on the Steve Howe CD Mothballs)
- MC5 (in 1965 as a demo)
- The McCoys (1965 debut album Hang on Sloopy)
- The Moody Blues (1965 debut album The Magnificent Moodies)
