= Syd Nathan =

American music executive, songwriter

Sydney Nathan (April 27, 1904 – March 5, 1968) was an American music business executive who founded King Records, a leading independent record label, in 1943.

He contributed to the development of country & western music, rhythm and blues and rock and roll and is credited with discovering many prominent musicians, most notably James Brown, whose first single, "Please, Please, Please", was released by Federal Records, a subsidiary of King, in 1956. Nathan was described as "One of the truly eccentric figures of the record industry ... [who] ruled his label like a dictator ... [and] constantly screamed and intimidated his artists and employees". He was posthumously inducted into the Rock and Roll Hall of Fame, in the non-performer category, in 1997. In 2026, he was likewise inducted into the Blues Hall of Fame.

== Biography ==
Nathan was born to a Jewish family in Cincinnati, Ohio. He left school in the ninth grade, suffering from poor eyesight and asthma. He played as a drummer in clubs and in early adulthood worked in a series of jobs in real estate, amusement parks, and pawn and jewelry stores. In the mid-1930s, with his sister and her husband, he opened a radio and phonograph store, before moving to Florida to be with his brother and open a photofinishing business.

He moved back to Cincinnati in the early 1940s and opened a record store, Syd's Record Shop, initially selling used jukebox records. In 1943 he started King Records; after it failed initially, he refinanced it with the support of family members. The label was originally intended to produce hillbilly records, but Nathan diversified when he discovered the demands of African-American teenagers for what were then called race records. Early records were pressed in Louisville, Kentucky, but because of their poor quality Nathan set up his own record-pressing plant in 1944 on the premises at 1540 Brewster Avenue in Cincinnati, the home of King Records for the next 25 years. He also set up a recording studio at that site and made his own distribution arrangements across the Midwest rather than relying on national companies.

He set up the Queen label to record R&B artists in 1945, but it was soon absorbed into the King label. Over the years, King assimilated many other smaller labels, including DeLuxe, and set up several subsidiaries, such as Federal. The company's talent scouts found many future recording stars. Early signings to the King label or its subsidiaries included Bull Moose Jackson, Lucky Millinder, Tiny Bradshaw, Earl Bostic, Eddie "Cleanhead" Vinson, Wynonie Harris, the Dominoes, Little Willie John, Bill Doggett, and Hank Ballard and the Midnighters, whose song "Work with Me, Annie" was one of the label's biggest successes. Nathan successfully recorded country performers, such as the Delmore Brothers, the Stanley Brothers, Moon Mullican, Cowboy Copas and Grandpa Jones, and also gospel singers. He actively encouraged white performers to record R&B songs and black performers to record country songs, not as an attempt at integration but as a way of maximising his song publishing revenue. Nathan said:

We saw a need. Why should we go into all those towns and only sell to the hillbilly accounts? Why can't we sell a few more while we're there? So we got in the race business.

According to his citation at the Rock and Roll Hall of Fame:

In the process of working with black R&B and white country artists, Nathan helped effect a cross-pollination of the two worlds, thereby helping lay the groundwork for the musical hybrid known as rock and roll.

In 1956, the talent scout Ralph Bass signed James Brown to King, where Brown recorded "Please, Please, Please". Nathan reportedly commented at the time, "That's the worse piece of crap I've heard in my life. It's someone stuttering on a record only saying one word ...". However, the record was a success. Nathan and Brown had a volatile relationship over the years, but Brown later said of Nathan, "I would be telling a lie if I said I would be a world star without the help of men like Mr. Nathan. He was the first one willing to take a chance on me." Brown continued to record for King, despite occasional lawsuits between the two and Nathan's initial refusal to fund Brown's album Live at the Apollo, recorded in 1962, which was one of his most successful and influential, reaching number 2 on the US album chart.

King Records was noted as one of the first racially integrated companies in the US record business and as "one of the few recording companies to make a record from start to finish, all under one roof." This gave the company a strong competitive edge, as it could record a song and press and distribute the recording within a week. By the 1960s, it had become the sixth largest record company in the US, and was responsible for over 250 hits on the rock, pop, R&B and country charts. However, King's impact declined in the 1960s, after Nathan was implicated in the payola scandal.

In addition to credits received in his own name, Nathan used the pseudonym Lois Mann for song publishing and copyrights in order to obtain a share of the songwriting royalties, a common practice among record company owners. Syd Nathan, Sydney Nathan, and Lois Mann are credited with writing 202 songs, including "Annie Had a Baby", "I'll Sail My Ship Alone", "Signed Sealed and Delivered", and "Train Kept A-Rollin'".

Nathan had long-standing health issues, and heart problems began to emerge during his fifties. He died of heart disease, complicated by pneumonia, in Miami, Florida, in 1968 at the age of 63. He was buried at the Judah Touro Cemetery, in Cincinnati.

== Legacy ==
Nathan was posthumously inducted into the Rock and Roll Hall of Fame in 1997 and the Bluegrass Hall of Fame in 2007. In 2026 he was further posthumously honored by his induction into the Blues Hall of Fame.

In the James Brown biopic Get on Up, Nathan is portrayed by the actor Fred Melamed.
