= Please, Please, Please (James Brown song) =

1956 single by James Brown and the Famous Flames

Single by James Brown and the Famous Flames

from the album Please Please Please
- B-side: "Why Do You Do Me"
- Released: February 26, 1956
- Recorded: February 4, 1956
- Studio: King, Cincinnati, Ohio
- Genre: Rhythm and blues
- Length: 2:43
- Label: Federal
- Songwriters: James Brown; Johnny Terry
- Producer: Ralph Bass

James Brown and the Famous Flames singles chronology
"Please, Please, Please" (1956)	"I Don't Know" (1956)

Audio video
- "Please, Please, Please" on YouTube

"Please, Please, Please" is a rhythm and blues song performed by James Brown and the Famous Flames. Written by Brown and Johnny Terry and released as a single on Federal Records in 1956, it reached No. 5 on the R&B charts. The group's debut recording and first chart hit, it has come to be recognized as their signature song.

== Background ==
In 1952, James Brown was released from a youth detention center in Toccoa, Georgia, after Bobby Byrd and his family sponsored him. Brown's warden agreed to the release on the condition that Brown not return to Augusta. After his release, Brown briefly pursued a career in sports before starting his musical career as a gospel vocalist with the group the Ever-Ready Gospel Singers. When a member of Bobby Byrd's vocal group, the Avons, died in 1954, Byrd asked Brown to join his group. A year later, after performing as the Five Royals, they became the Flames, playing all over Georgia and South Carolina.

According to Etta James, Brown and his group came up with the idea for their first song, because Brown "used to carry around an old tattered napkin with him, because Little Richard had written the words, 'please, please, please' on it and Brown was determined to make a song out of it".

== Reception ==
"Please, Please, Please" was released on February 26, 1956. Though it sold slowly at first, the record reached the top ten of the R&B charts by late summer, eventually peaking at No. 5 on both the Billboard Best R&B Sellers in Stores and Most Played R&B by Jockeys chart on July 14, 1956, selling between one and three million copies.

In 2001, the 1956 version by James Brown and the Famous Flames on Federal Records was inducted into the Grammy Hall of Fame.

The song was ranked number 272 among the greatest singles ever made in Dave Marsh's 1989 book The Heart of Rock & Soul. In 2011, "Please, Please, Please" was ranked No. 143 on Rolling Stone magazine's list of the "500 Greatest Songs of All Time". In June 2026, CBS News included the song in its list of the 250 essential American songs of the past 250 years.

== Live performances ==
The initial performances of the song were subpar though the group itself was received well. It took a number of years until the Flames developed a routine for the performance. Starting in 1959, Brown would perform the song to the point of feigned exhaustion, when he would drop to his knees and collapse on the stage. Meanwhile, a fellow Flame (sometimes Bobby Byrd and at other times Bobby Bennett) would drop either a blanket or big towel around Brown's back and help him offstage. Before completely exiting, Brown would rip the towel off and return to his microphone, adding to the excitement of his audience.

Influenced by Little Richard and professional wrestler Gorgeous George, who both wore capes, Brown began wearing capes in his act.

== Personnel ==
- James Brown – lead vocal

with the Flames:

- Bobby Byrd – background vocals
- Johnny Terry – background vocals
- Sylvester Keels – background vocals
- Nash Knox – background vocals
- Nafloyd Scott – guitar

plus:

- Wilbert "Lee Diamond" Smith – tenor saxophone
- Ray Felder – tenor saxophone
- Lucas "Fats" Gonder – piano
- Clarence Mack – bass
- Edison Gore – drums

== Filmed performances ==
- Brown and the Famous Flames performed "Please, Please, Please" as part of their set in The T.A.M.I. Show in 1964.
- In the film Blues Brothers 2000 (1998), Brown performs the song after the closing credits.
- In Barry Levinson's Liberty Heights (1999), an actor in the role of Brown performs the song in a theater along Baltimore's Pennsylvania Avenue.
- A live version of the song appears in the 1991 film The Commitments.
- Brown and the Famous Flames also sang and performed "Please Please Please" on a 1964 telecast of Dick Clark's Where the Action Is on ABC.

== Other versions and recordings ==
"Please, Please, Please"

Single by Ike & Tina Turner

from the album Ike & Tina Turner Revue Live
- B-side: "Am I a Fool in Love"
- Released: November 1964
- Venue: Club Imperial, St. Louis, Missouri, U.S.
- Genre: R&B
- Length: 2:40
- Label: Kent
- Songwriters: Brown, Terry

Ike & Tina Turner singles chronology
"I Can't Believe What You Say (for Seeing What You Do)" (1964)	"Please, Please, Please" (1964)	"Ooh Poo Pah Doo" (1964)

In 1964, during a contract dispute between Brown and King Records' head Syd Nathan, the label reissued the original 1956 performance of "Please, Please, Please" with overdubbed crowd noise in an attempt to pass it off as a live recording. The reissue reached No. 95 on the Billboard Hot 100.

Brown also re-recorded the song several times later in his career. On his 1972 album Get on the Good Foot, he did an upbeat long version, which lasted over twelve minutes. 1974's Hell included a salsa version of the song that featured Brown speaking in Spanish. For Brown's 1976 album Hot, he recorded a more solemn, ballad rendition, which featured male background vocalists in the quiet storm style of Barry White's music.

Ike & Tina Turner released a live version of "Please, Please, Please" as a single on Kent Records, which was included on their 1964 album Ike & Tina Turner Revue Live. They also performed the song on The Big T.N.T. Show in 1965. After their resurgence on the charts, Kent reissued the single in 1970. It reached No. 45 on Record World's R&B chart.

The song (with altered lyrics) was covered by the Who on their 1965 debut album My Generation.

In February 1967, Swedish band the Maniacs, featuring a young Tommy Körberg, recorded the song as a single. Released as a single in March of that year, backed by Paul Ferris "Visions", it became the group's breakthrough hit, reaching No. 5 on Tio i Topp and No. 12 on sales chart Kvällstoppen that year.

The song was covered by the Residents on their 1984 tribute album George & James.
