= The Famous Flames =

American R&B vocal group

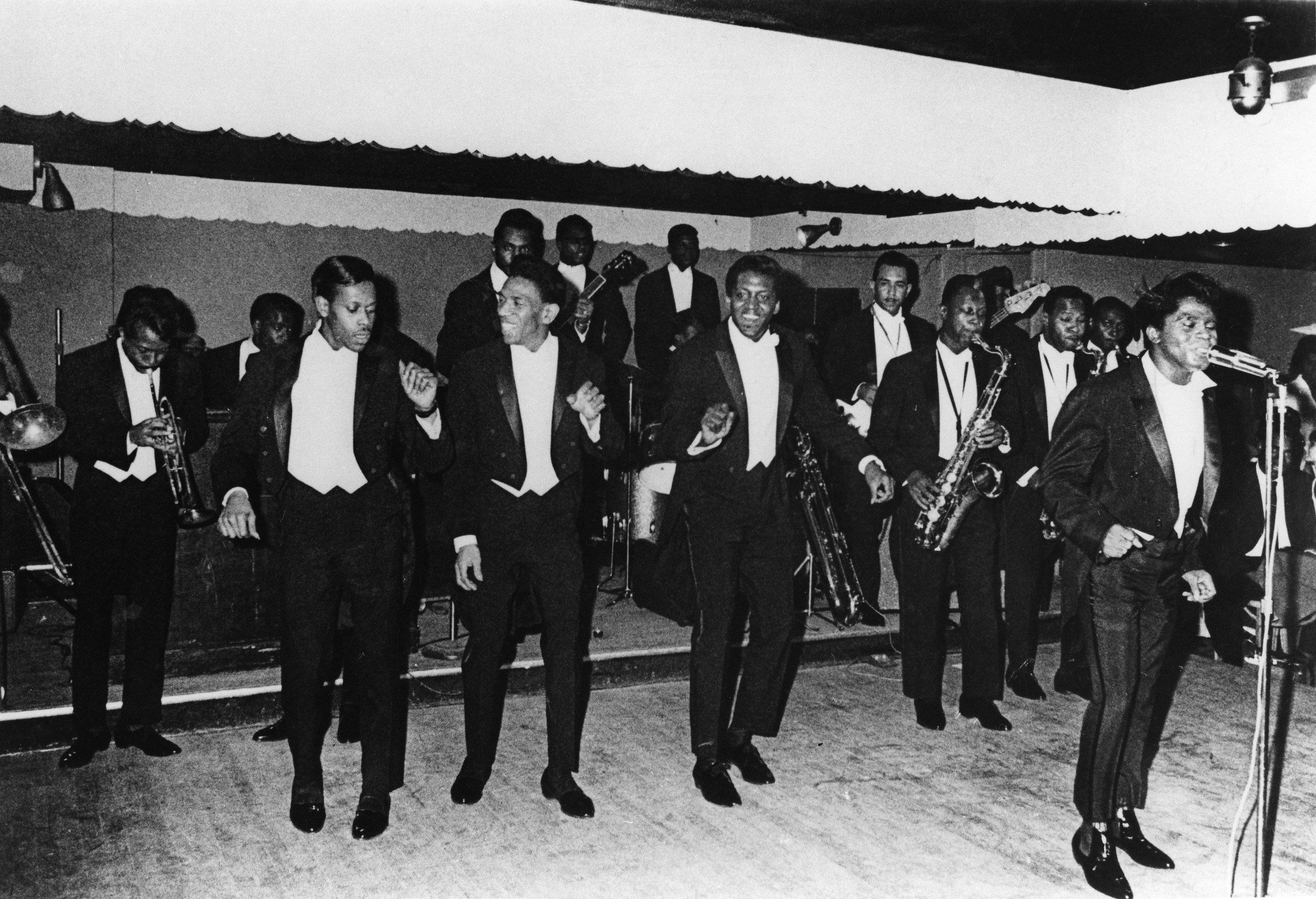
- The Famous Flames with the James Brown Orchestra

Background information
- Also known as: The Avons, The Toccoa Band, The Flames, James Brown and The Famous Flames, James Brown and His Famous Flames, The Fabulous Flames
- Origin: Toccoa, Georgia, U.S.
- Genres: Rhythm and blues; soul; funk
- Years active: 1953–1968
- Labels: Federal; King; Smash
- Past members: James Brown; Bobby Byrd; Johnny Terry; Sylvester Keels; Nash Knox; Nafloyd Scott; Bobby Bennett; Baby Lloyd Stallworth; Troy Collins; Fred Pulliam; Roy Scott; Doyle Oglesby; Robert Gram; JW Archer; Louis Madison; Bill Hollings; Willie Johnson

The Famous Flames were an American rhythm and blues, soul vocal group founded in Toccoa, Georgia, the United States, in 1953 by Bobby Byrd. James Brown first began his career as a member of the Famous Flames, emerging as the lead singer by the time of their first appearance in a professional recording, "Please, Please, Please", in 1956.

On hit songs such as "Try Me", "Bewildered", "Think", "I Don't Mind", and "I'll Go Crazy", the Flames' smooth backing harmonies contrasted strikingly with Brown's raw, impassioned singing, and their synchronized dance steps were a prominent feature of their live shows. Altogether, James Brown and the Famous Flames numerous R&B hit songs reached the Top 40 on the R&B and pop charts.They also appeared in the Hollywood films T.A.M.I. Show (1964) and Ski Party. Members of the Flames also contributed as songwriters and choreographers. In 2012, the Flames were retroactively inducted into the Rock & Roll Hall of Fame alongside Brown. On their Rock & Roll Hall of Fame page, they are described as "a group of singers, performers and dancers that created the complementary elements of one of the greatest stage shows of all time." As of 2020, The Famous Flames were also inducted into The National Rhythm and Blues Hall of Fame.

The Famous Flames are sometimes erroneously identified as James Brown's "band", a confusion partly fostered by their record companies' inconsistent labeling credit practices. Although members of the group did play instruments in some of their earliest shows and recordings, by 1959 Brown had hired a touring band and from that point on, the Flames contributed primarily as backing vocalists and dancers. The band was billed separately as the James Brown Band, and later as the James Brown Orchestra.

== History ==
=== Origins ===
James Brown began singing with the R&B group the Cremona Trio while growing up in Toccoa, Georgia. In 1949, Brown, then sixteen, was sent to a juvenile detention center after committing several offenses of armed robbery. While at the detention center, he formed a group called the Swanees, which included Johnny Terry. The band made their own instruments, including a comb and paper, a washtub bass and a drum kit made from lard tubs, while Brown himself played "a sort of mandolin [made] out of a wooden box." This led to Brown's first nickname, "Music Box".

In 1952, Brown's reform school baseball team played another team that featured Bobby Byrd and they soon became friends. Shortly after, Byrd and his family offered to be Brown's sponsors for an early prison release. Brown was paroled on June 14, 1952, on the condition he not return to his hometown. In response, Brown moved into Byrd's parents' home in Toccoa, finding work as a dishwasher and also trying short careers as a boxer.

Around this time, Byrd had formed the gospel vocal group, the Gospel Starlighters. Within a year, the group wanted to perform R&B but was afraid of being confronted by church leaders for "singing the Devil's music". This led the group to perform R&B under the name The Avons, which included members such as Troy Collins, Doyle Oglesby, Sylvester Keels and Willie Johnson. After deciding to focus primarily on R&B, the Starlighters ended.

In 1954, Brown again turned his attention to music with the group the Ever Ready Gospel Singers, which included his old reform school friend, Johnny Terry, who had been paroled at approximately the same time as Brown. However, when the group failed to get a recording deal they disbanded, leading Brown to return to Toccoa. Later in 1954, the Avons faced a tragedy when Troy Collins died in a car accident. Byrd asked Brown to replace Collins. At first, lead vocals were split between Byrd, Keels and Brown. Johnny Terry was also asked to join and he brought in a guitarist, Nafloyd Scott, and Fred Pulliam replaced Willie Johnson. It was around this time that the Avons changed their name to The Toccoa Band in order to avoid confusion with two other groups also named the Avons. Under their manager, Barry Tremier, the group began playing instruments, with Brown playing drums and Byrd the piano.

=== Early success and initial breakup ===
By 1955, after seeing a performance by Little Richard, the group left gospel behind and again changed their name, to The Flames. While performing at his club in Macon, Georgia, Clint Brantley (agent for Little Richard) advised the group to add "Famous" to their name. That year, Doyle Oglesby and Fred Pulliam left the group and were replaced by Nashpendle "Nash" Knox when Little Richard left Macon for Los Angeles after the September 1955 release of "Tutti Frutti".

The group began composing and performing their own songs during this time including a James Brown composition called "Goin' Back to Rome" and a ballad Brown co-wrote with Johnny Terry titled "Please, Please, Please". Before Christmas 1955, Brantley had the group record a demo of "Please, Please, Please" for a local Macon radio station. "Please, Please, Please" came together in two pieces, first, Etta James stated that during the first time she met with Brown in Macon, Brown "used to carry around an old tattered napkin with him, because Little Richard had written the words, 'please, please, please' on it and James was determined to make a song out of it...". The second part of the song's conception came together after Brown and Terry heard The Orioles' rock 'n' roll version of Big Joe Williams' hit, "Baby, Please Don't Go", where they got the melody.

"Please, Please, Please" was played on Macon radio stations, making it a regional hit by the end of 1955. The recording was sent to several record labels, who promptly passed on the record, though two labels, owned by Cincinnati-based King Records, pursued the group. Ralph Bass of Federal Records eventually won the bidding war, signing the Famous Flames in February 1956. A month later, they re-recorded the song in Cincinnati. Upon hearing it, King Records founder Syd Nathan deemed it unreleasable due to Brown's vocals, and almost fired Ralph Bass on the spot.

"Please, Please, Please" was released in May 1956 and by September, the record had reached number 6 on the R&B charts. Constantly performing the song while the group toured the Chitlin' Circuit kept the record on the charts for a year, and by 1957, it had sold well over 5,000 copies. The record eventually sold between one million and three million. Most of the original Flames' releases after "Please, Please, Please" failed to generate any follow-up success, including "I Don't Know", "No No No", "Just Won't Do Right" and "Chonnie-On-Chon". The group had changed managers and were now with Ben Bart, chief of the Universal Attractions Agency(talent agency). Bart advised the group to change their name to The Famous Flames with James Brown. Brown and Bart hired members of the vocal group the Dominions to replace the original Flames, after the group quit en masse when they had discovered that James Brown was to be given top billing over the other members. At this point, The Famous Flames became a vocal group exclusively, with no instrumental members...as Brown had hired the JC Davis outfit as his instrumental backup band.

=== Success ===
After several other recordings failed to chart, the Famous Flames were in danger of being dropped by Federal in 1958. Johnny Terry gave Brown a ballad that was based on the song "For Your Precious Love" by Jerry Butler & The Impressions titled "Try Me". This song became the turning point in the Famous Flames' career: their first number-one R&B hit in early 1959...and the group's first appearance in the Billboard Hot 100 Pop Chart, peaking at #48. Following the song's success, Brown suddenly fired the interim group members of the Dominions/Flames, "Big Bill" Hollings, J.W. Archer, and Louis Madison. These men, along with the returning Willie Johnson, another interim member, went on to form a San Francisco-based splinter group, The Fabulous Flames. This group issued several unsuccessful singles on the tiny "Bay-Tone Records" label, before fading into obscurity. By then, Brown and Terry had asked Bobby Byrd to return, which he did, and they added new Flames members Bobby Bennett and Lloyd Stallworth. This was the longest-lasting lineup of The Famous Flames, which became a straight vocal group exclusively at this point, as Brown, with Byrd's help, had employed the old J.C. Davis outfit, The Bucketheads, as his instrumental backup band. The group (now James Brown and The Famous Flames) then performed at the Apollo Theater in April 1959, Brown's first performance there, opening for Little Willie John.

That year, Brown had his first solo hit, "I Want You So Bad", which peaked in the top twenty on the R&B charts. In 1960,after a regional hit,with “Good Good Lovin’ (Federal 45-12361), Brown and the Flames had a string of successful songs such as "Think", "Bewildered","I Don't Mind", "This Old Heart",”Shout and Shimmy” and "I'll Go Crazy". By 1962, three versions of "The James Brown Show" were recorded: James with the Famous Flames, James with his instrumental band, and James as a solo act. In 1962, the Famous Flames had a hit with "Shout and Shimmy", which was their rendition of The Isley Brothers' "Shout", but the song was dismissed by at least one critic as "a truly shameless ripoff of [the song]... basically the fast parts of "Shout" with the gospel inflections removed and the word 'shimmy' added." Nevertheless,"Shout and Shimmy" was a hit, and James and The Famous Flames sang and performed this song on Dick Clark's American Bandstand, on a telecast dated June 11, 1962. Their 1963 live recording at the Apollo Theater was released as Live at the Apollo, which peaked at number-two on the pop album chart. It sold over a million copies and stayed on the charts for fourteen months, a feat unprecedented for an R&B album at that time. In 1964, the group reached a peak in its popularity when they appeared in the 1964 American International Pictures concert film, The T.A.M.I. Show. This star-studded concert film was filmed live, over two days, at the Santa Monica Civic Auditorium in California. At this show, Brown & The Flames (Byrd, Bennett, and Stallworth), debuted their landmark performance of "Please, Please, Please" during that concert, where Brown collapsed on his knees, causing Bobby Bennett and MC Danny Ray to drape a cape (or towel) on him and walk him off before Brown decided to return to the microphone. This became a trademark in Brown's shows for the remainder of his career.

In 1964, the group recorded another successful live album, Pure Dynamite! Live at the Royal, which like Live at The Apollo, reached the Top 10 of the Billboard Pop Album chart. The Flames also contributed to the recording of the 1964 studio album, Showtime. During this time, the record label's inconsistent billing on various records and albums, led many fans of Brown to believe that the Famous Flames were actually Brown's backing band, instead of the stand-alone vocal group that they actually were. In 1964, James & the Flames had another top 40 hit with the powerful soul/blues ballad "Oh Baby, Don't You Weep", which reached number 23 on the pop chart, and number four on the Cashbox R&B chart. Later that year they released their last recording together, "Maybe the Last Time", which was a B-side of James Brown's recording "Out of Sight". On this last studio release, as on all of their Smash recordings, The Flames did not receive label credit.

=== Brown's ascension and the group's decline ===
In 1964, when the Flames where still together, James Brown and Bobby Byrd formed their own production company, Fair Deal, in an attempt to promote their recordings to a crossover audience. As a result, Brown signed a contract with Smash Records, a subsidiary of Mercury to distribute the records and Brown released 8 albums from Smash Records. After the release of first funk song "Out of Sight", however, King Records stopped Brown from releasing any more recordings since he had not obtained the label's consent. After that year-long standoff, King Records (who couldn't afford to lose him, as by then Brown had become the label's biggest star), offered him a new contract, which gave him full creative control over his recordings Upon his return to King, Brown recorded by himself, without The Famous Flames' vocal backing, though they continued to receive label credit, and continued performing with Brown on live appearances (and on live albums) through 1968. In 1965, King released Brown's "Papa's Got a Brand New Bag", which became Brown's first number 1 as a solo artist on the R&B charts, as well reaching the top 10 of the Billboard Hot 100. Hit singles such as "I Got You" (I Feel Good), and "Papa's Got a Brand New Bag" followed his hit song "Out of Sight".

The group performed in Hollywood movies such as Ski Party and appearing twice on The Ed Sullivan Show in 1966 (where The Flames were uncredited). The group also began to perform overseas and became a major attraction. About their success outside America, Famous Flame Bobby Bennett said, in a 2012 interview with the Cleveland Plain Dealer; "We were drawing crowds everywhere we went," says Bennett. "Not just in America. We'd go to London or Paris and we couldn't even leave the hotel to go sightseeing because we were getting mobbed by people."

Brown's solo aspirations led to further dissension within the group, who felt they weren't being compensated properly. Lloyd Stallworth left the Flames shortly after the group's first appearance on The Ed Sullivan Show in early 1966, leaving Brown, Byrd, and Bennett. Dissension continued to grow throughout 1966 and 1967, and in 1968 the rest of the members of the Famous Flames (Bobby Byrd and Bobby Bennett), decided to go on with their own separate careers, and the group quietly disappeared. In 1968, King released the group's Live at the Apollo, Volume II but edited out the Famous Flames' introduction, since the group had left Brown by then.However, years later, on the 2001 Deluxe Edition CD release, the complete introduction by MC Frankie Crocker, including The Famous Flames' name, was restored.

=== Later years and litigation ===
Although Byrd reunited with Brown on several occasions in the ensuing decades, the Famous Flames never performed with him as a group again. Brown wrote dismissively of them in his 1986 autobiography, claiming that though "they were a good stage act, [they] couldn't really sing all that good." However, elsewhere he referred to them favorably as "a bunch of real fine quartet singers".

In 2003, Byrd and his wife, Vicki Anderson, along with Famous Flames Bobby Bennett and Lloyd Stallworth, sued Brown and Universal Records (which now owned the King Records catalogue), claiming they were cheated out of royalties from samples of Byrd's 1971 hit "I Know You Got Soul" and numerous other Famous Flames hits over the years. Despite rumors of bad blood, Byrd contended he "still loved" Brown and felt the matter was more due to issues with Universal than with Brown.

Lloyd Stallworth died in 2001, followed by Johnny Terry in 2005 and James Brown died December 25, 2006. Bobby Byrd performed at Brown's public funeral in Augusta, Georgia. Byrd died nine months later, in September 2007. Bobby Bennett, the last living member of The Famous Flames, lived long enough to see the group inducted into the 2012 class of the Rock and Roll Hall of Fame, before himself dying on January 18, 2013. The Famous Flames were posthumously inducted into The National Rhythm and Blues Hall of Fame in two separate inductions: James Brown in 2013, and the remaining Flames, Byrd, Bennett, Stallworth, and Johnny Terry, in 2020.

== Rock and Roll Hall of Fame controversy and 2012 induction ==
In 1986, the first committee of the Rock & Roll Hall of Fame announced that James Brown would be one of the Hall of Fame's first charter members to be inducted. However, Brown's former singing group, the Famous Flames, were not included in this induction. The Rock & Roll Hall of Fame's criterion states that only artists whose first recording had been out for more than 25 years were eligible for induction. Brown's first solo recording did not meet that criterion. Rock & Roll Hall of Fame president and chief executive officer Terry Stewart contended that Brown was indeed eligible for induction but as a member of The Famous Flames. Concerning the Hall of Fame's failure to induct The Flames with Brown back in 1986, Stewart went on to say: "There was no legislative intent why they weren't included; somehow they just got overlooked."

In 2011, a special committee was set up to correct exclusions which might have occurred during the first two years of Rock Hall inductions (1986 and 1987) due to the impact of the bands' lead singers or front men. The Famous Flames (Byrd, Bennett, Terry and Stallworth) were inducted in April 2012 alongside other "backing groups" such as The Midnighters (Hank Ballard), The Comets (Bill Haley), The Crickets (Buddy Holly), The Blue Caps (Gene Vincent) and The Miracles (Smokey Robinson). Since all these lead singers were actually members of these groups, these were not really "backing groups" at all. This was highlighted by Smokey Robinson, who did the induction honors for all of the groups, including his own Miracles, who stated, "These people do not stand behind you. They stand with you." "These are not backing groups. These are the groups." Bennett, as the Famous Flames' only surviving member, accepted the honor in person in Cleveland on April 14, 2012. Bennett further stated the induction was not only a correction for the Rock and Roll Hall of Fame committee's mishap in 1986 but also a reunion: "For years, I felt like we were all separated," said Bennett. "I feel like we're whole again, I wish we could all be here as one group. Yes, James Brown was the most famous of the Flames, but we were all Famous Flames."

Onstage, during the induction ceremony, Miracles lead singer Smokey Robinson, said, "If James Brown was "The Hardest Working Man in Show Business", The Famous Flames were the hardest-working group".

In 1993, James Brown and The Famous Flames as a group were awarded the Rhythm and Blues Foundation's Lifetime Achievement Award by Foundation co-founder Ruth Brown and Bonnie Raitt. in 1998, Famous Flames founder Bobby Byrd received the Pioneer Award from the same organization.

The Famous Flames did appear in the James Brown biopic Get On Up, which was released in U.S. theatres nationwide on August 1, 2014.

In May 2012, the oldies music magazine Goldmine inducted James Brown & The Famous Flames into their first class of The Goldmine Hall of Fame.

== Lineup ==
- James Brown
- Bobby Byrd
- Johnny Terry
- Sylvester 'King' Keels
- Nash Knox
- Nafloyd Scott
- Bobby Bennett
- "Baby Lloyd" Stallworth
- Troy Collins
- Fred Pulliam
- Roy Scott
- Doyle Oglesby
- Robert Gram
- JW Archer
- Louis Madison
- Bill Hollings
- Willie Johnson

== Discography ==
- 1958: Please Please Please
- 1959: Try Me
- 1960: Think!
- 1961: The Amazing James Brown
- 1962: James Brown and His Famous Flames Tour the U.S.A.

== Awards ==
- Grammy Hall of Fame:
- "Live at The Apollo" (King Records, 1963) -James Brown & The Famous Flames* (Inducted 1998)
- "Please, Please, Please"-James Brown & The Famous Flames (Federal (King) Records, 1956 R&B Single) – Inducted 2001
- "Rock and Roll Hall of Fame" – The Famous Flames (Inducted 2012) James Brown (Inducted 1986)
- Goldmine (magazine) Hall of Fame – James Brown & The Famous Flames (Inducted 2012)
- Rolling Stone's 500 Greatest Albums of All Time
- "Live at The Apollo" (1963) – James Brown & The Famous Flames* (Awarded 2003)
- "United States Library of Congress-National Recording Registry"
- "Rhythm and Blues Foundation" Lifetime Achievement Award (James Brown & The Famous Flames-1993)
- "Rhythm and Blues Foundation" Pioneer Award - (Bobby Byrd alone) - 1998.
- "National Rhythm & Blues Hall of Fame" The Famous Flames (Inducted 2020) (James Brown inducted solo in 2013).
- "Live at The Apollo" (1963) – James Brown & The Famous Flames* (Awarded 2004)
- "The Rock and Roll Hall of Fame's"
- "500 Songs That Shaped Rock and Roll"
- "Please, Please, Please" – James Brown & The Famous Flames* (Federal (King) Records, 1956
  - R&B Single (list compiled 2004)
- Billboard – "Try Me" – James Brown & The Famous Flames
    1. 48 Pop, #1 R&B, and the Best-Selling R&B Hit Song of 1958, .
  - Incorrectly credited solely to James Brown.*

== See also ==
- Marva Whitney
- Lyn Collins
- Vicki Anderson

== Other sources ==
- White, Cliff; Weinger, Harry (1991). "Are You Ready for Star Time?". Star Time [CD liner notes]. London: Polydor Records.
- Wolk, Douglas (2004). Live at the Apollo. New York: Continuum Books.
