= Billboard Top R&B Records of 1956 =

Billboard Top R&B Records of 1956 is made up of three year-end charts compiled by Billboard magazine ranking the year's top rhythm and blues records based on record sales, disc jockey plays, and juke box plays.

Retail	Juke box	Disk jockey	Title	Artist(s)	Label
1	13	5	"Honky Tonk"	Bill Doggett	King
2	2	1	"I'm in Love Again"	Fats Domino	Imperial
3	3	3	"Long Tall Sally"	Little Richard	Specialty
4	6	4	"Fever"	Little Willie John	King
5	1	2	"The Great Pretender"	The Platters	Mercury
6	9	6	"Why Do Fools Fall in Love"	The Teenagers	Gee
7	38	31	"I Want You to Be My Girl"	The Teenagers	Gee
8	7	12	"My Prayer"	The Platters	Mercury
9	10	21	"Blue Suede Shoes"	Carl Perkins	Sun
10	11	10	"Let the Good Times Roll"	Shirley & Lee	Aladdin
11	21	18	"Rip It Up"	Little Richard	Specialty
12	4	7	"Tutti Frutti"	Little Richard	Specialty
13	8	8	"Drown in My Own Tears"	Ray Charles	Atlantic
14	25	13	"Don't Be Cruel"	Elvis Presley	RCA Victor
15	12	15	"Treasure of Love"	Clyde McPhatter	Atlantic
16	15	14	"Eddie My Love"	The Teen Queens	RPM
17	48	20	"Please, Please, Please"	James Brown	Federal
18	20	34	"Speedoo"	The Cadillacs	Josie
19	37	24	"Heartbreak Hotel"	Elvis Presley	RCA Victor
20	33	26	"It's Too Late"	Chuck Willis	Atlantic
21	15	25	"Hound Dog"	Elvis Presley	RCA Victor
22	29	30	"In the Still of the Night"	The Five Satins	Ember
23	5	11	"Seven Days"	The Drifters	Atlantic
24	23	19	"(You've Got) The Magic Touch"	The Platters	Mercury
25	28	16	"Blueberry Hill"	Fats Domino	Imperial
26	14	27	"Corrine, Corrina"	Big Joe Turner	Atlantic
27	35	23	"My Blue Heaven"	Fats Domino	Imperial
28	27	38	"Stranded in the Jungle"	The Cadets	Modern
29	NR	37	"Need Your Love So Bad"	Little Willie John	King
30	41	8	"Slippin' and Slidin'	Little Richard	Specialty

== See also ==
- List of Billboard number-one R&B songs of 1956
- Billboard year-end top 30 singles of 1956
- 1956 in music
