= Night Life (Billy Butler album) =

Studio album by Billy Butler
- Released: 1971
- Recorded: December 21, 1970
- Studio: Van Gelder Studio, Englewood Cliffs, New Jersey
- Genre: Jazz
- Length: 35:43
- Label: Prestige; PR 7854
- Producer: Bob Porter

Billy Butler chronology
Yesterday, Today & Tomorrow (1970)	Night Life (1971)	Billy Butler Plays Via Galactica (1973)

Night Life is the fourth album by guitarist Billy Butler which was recorded in late 1970 and released on the Prestige label the following year. The album was released on CD combined with Butler's debut album This Is Billy Butler! as Billy Butler: Legends of Acid Jazz in 1998 but, confusingly, was not part the CD release also titled Night Life which compiled Butler's other two albums for Prestige Guitar Soul! and Yesterday, Today & Tomorrow.

== Reception ==
Professional ratings
Review scores
Source	Rating
Allmusic	4.5/5 stars

Allmusic awarded the compilation album 4½ stars stating "Butler was a versatile musician who, on ballads in particular displayed a very interesting sound, sometimes sliding between notes as if he were playing a steel guitar".

== Track listing ==
1. "Night Life" (Walt Breeland, Paul Buskirk, Willie Nelson) - 5:58
2. "Wave" (Antonio Carlos Jobim) - 5:53
3. "Watch What Happens" (Jacques Demy, Norman Gimbel, Michel Legrand) - 5:06
4. "Peacock Alley" (Billy Butler, Bill Doggett) - 4:10
5. "Prelude to a Kiss" (Duke Ellington, Irving Gordon, Irving Mills) - 5:08
6. "In a Mellow Tone" (Ellington, Milt Gabler) - 9:43

== Personnel ==
- Billy Butler - guitar
- Jesse Powell - tenor saxophone
- Houston Person - tenor saxophone (tracks 3 & 6)
- Johnny "Hammond" Smith - organ, electric piano (track 3)
- Bob Bushnell - electric bass
- Jimmy Johnson - drums
