= List of Billboard number-one R&B songs of 1956 =

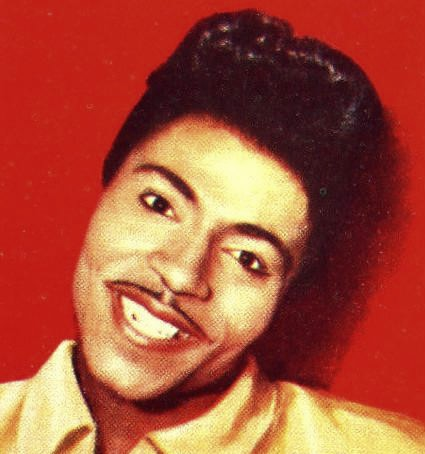
"Long Tall Sally" was the first number one for rock and roll pioneer Little Richard.

In 1956, Billboard magazine published three charts specifically covering the top-performing songs in the United States in rhythm and blues and related African-American-oriented music genres. The R&B Best Sellers in Stores chart ranked records based on their "current national selling importance at the retail level", based on a survey of record retailers "with a high volume of sales in rhythm and blues records". The Most Played R&B by Jockeys listing ranked songs based on the "number of plays on disk jockey radio shows" according to a weekly survey of "top disk jockey shows in all key markets". The Most Played R&B in Juke Boxes chart was based on "plays in juke boxes thruout [sic] the country" derived from a survey of "operators using a high proportion of rhythm and blues records". The three charts are considered part of the lineage of the magazine's multimetric R&B chart launched in 1958, which since 2005 has been published under the title Hot R&B/Hip Hop Songs.

In the issue of Billboard dated January 7, the number-one position on both the best sellers and jockeys charts was held by "The Great Pretender" by the Platters; the song topped the former listing for the first 10 weeks of 1956 and the latter for the first 11 weeks. It also reached the peak position on the juke box chart in the issue dated January 28 and remained there for nine weeks, meaning that for seven weeks it was atop all three listings. The song also topped the pop charts, an unusual occurrence at the time for a black act, and has come to be regarded as a pop and R&B classic; the song has been inducted into the Grammy Hall of Fame and was included in Rolling Stone's 2003 list of the 500 Greatest Songs of All Time. The song's spell leading the jockeys chart was the year's longest unbroken run at number one on any of the charts; the highest total number of weeks atop any one chart was achieved by Bill Doggett's "Honky Tonk (Parts 1 & 2)", which spent 13 non-consecutive weeks at number one on the best sellers listing.

Several of 1956's number ones were by acts regarded as among the most influential in the development of rock and roll music, which had broken into the mainstream in the previous year. In April, Little Richard gained his first number one when "Long Tall Sally" reached the peak position on all three listings; although his period of chart-topping success would last only until 1957, AllMusic describes him as "arguably the greatest and most influential of the '50s rock & roll singers". In September, Elvis Presley achieved his first R&B chart-topper when the double-sided single "Don't Be Cruel" / "Hound Dog" topped the juke box chart; the single went on to also top the best sellers chart but neither side reached number one on the jockeys listing. Presley would go on to be regarded as the most successful and influential recording artist of all time, feted as the "King of Rock and Roll". Fats Domino, another pioneer of rock and roll, had achieved number ones prior to 1956 and was one of the most successful artists of the year; his recording of "Blueberry Hill" had lengthy runs atop all three charts and ended the year at number one on all the listings.

== Chart history ==
In 1956, Billboard sometimes listed both sides of a single jointly at number one on the Best Sellers and Juke Box charts, based on a methodology which combined the survey data for both songs if "significant action [was] reported on both sides of a record". This does not indicate that the single was officially released or promoted as a double A-side.

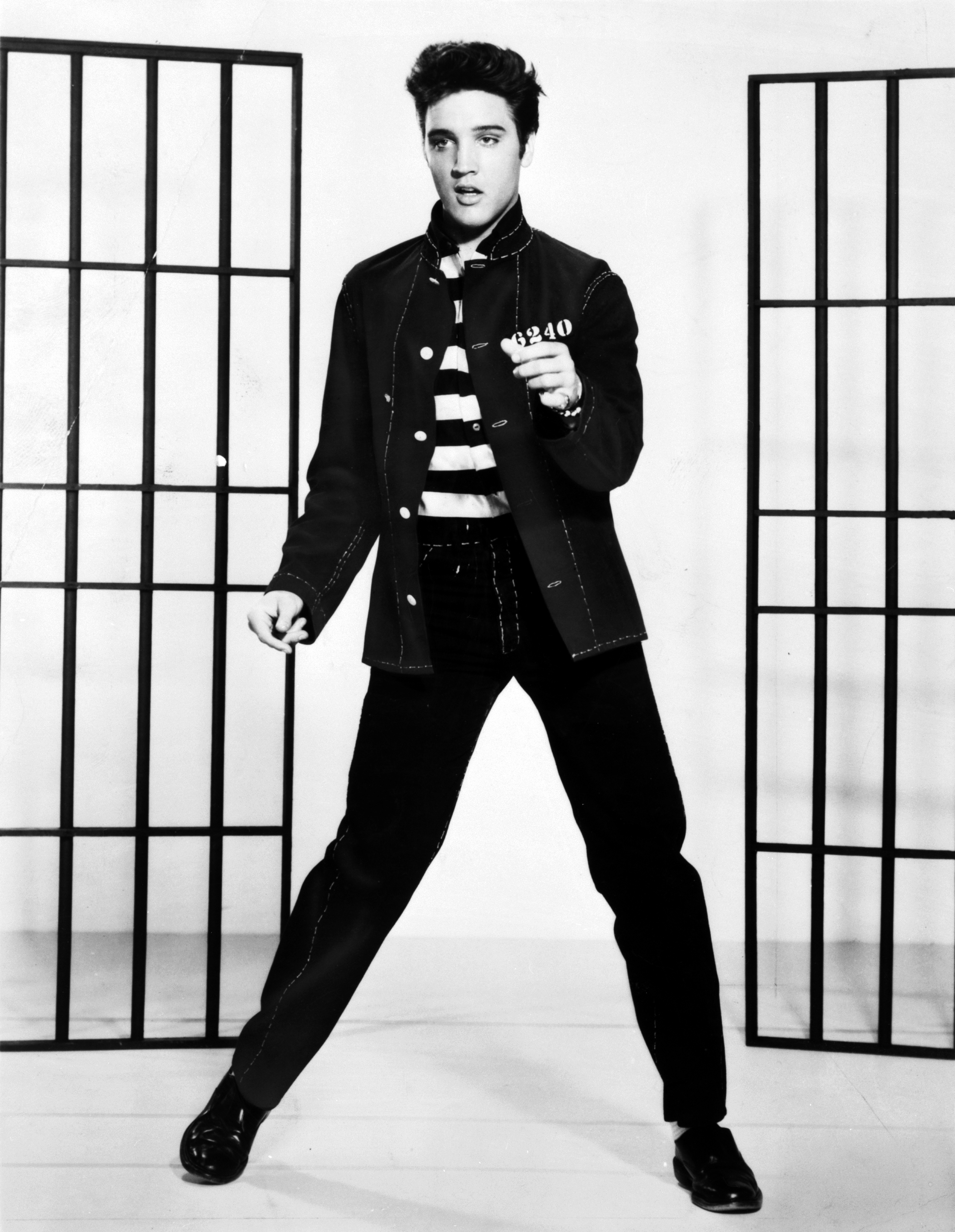
Elvis Presley topped the charts with "Hound Dog" and "Don't Be Cruel".

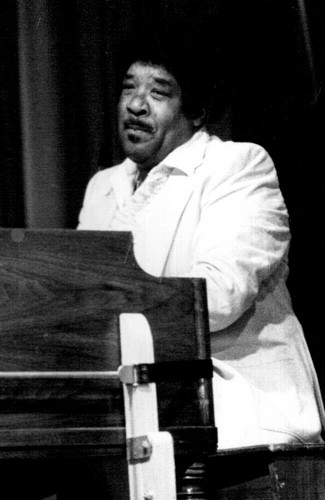
Bill Doggett (pictured in 1980) had a long-running number one with "Honky Tonk".

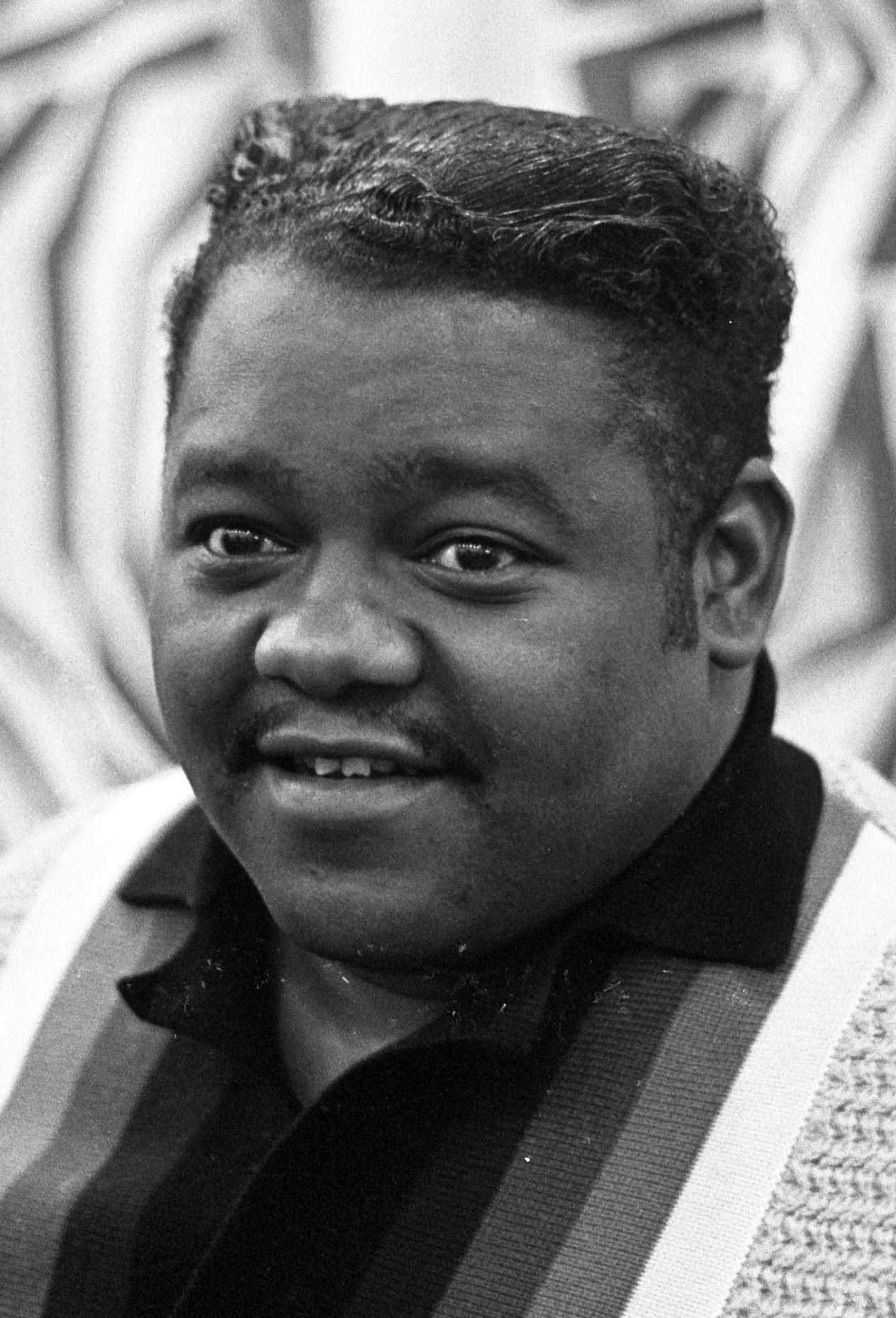
Fats Domino was one of 1956's most successful artists.

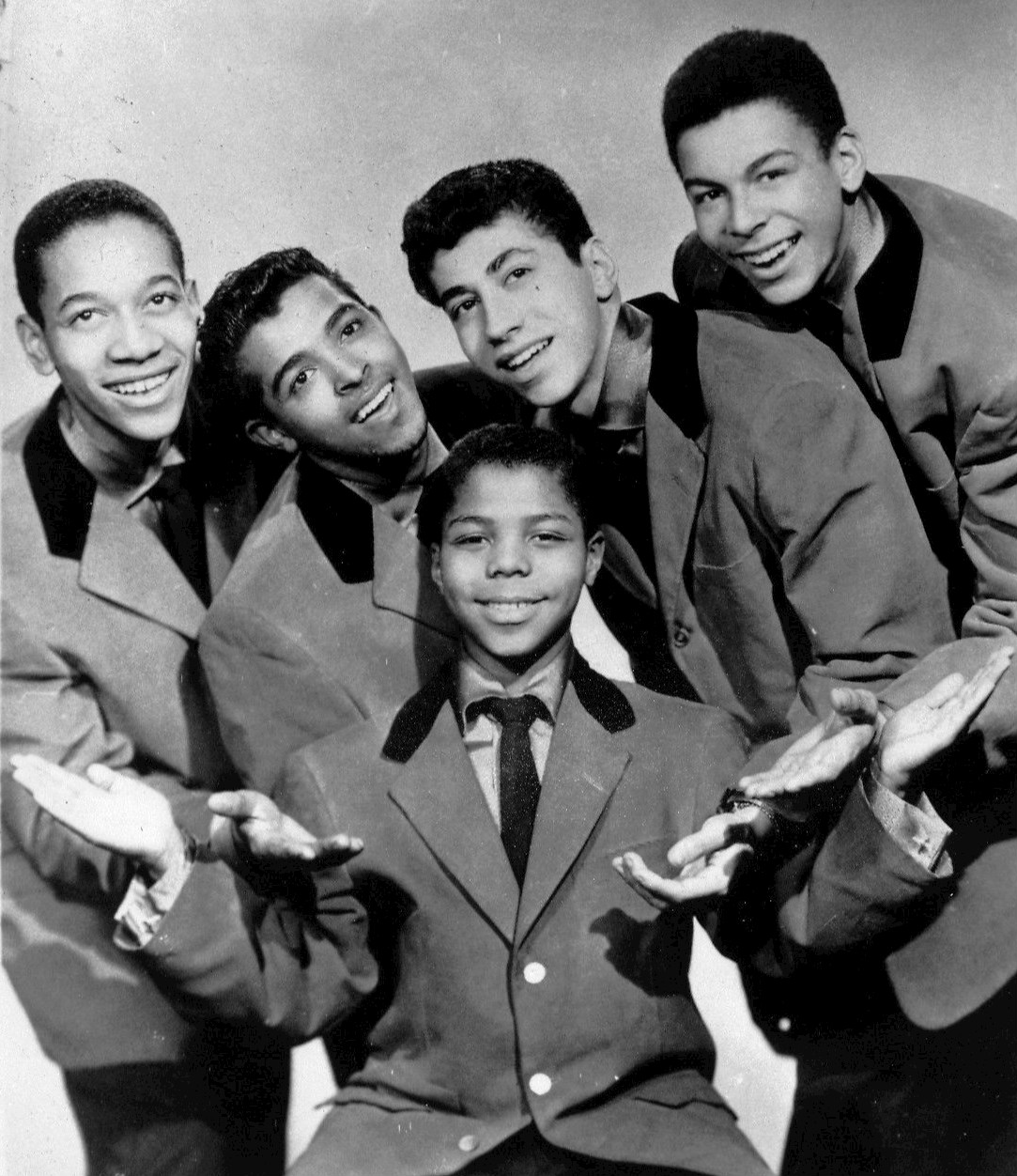
"Why Do Fools Fall in Love" was a chart-topper for The Teenagers featuring Frankie Lymon.

Chart history
Issue date	Best Sellers		Jockeys		Juke Box		Ref.
Issue date	Title	Artist(s)	Title	Artist(s)	Title	Artist(s)	Ref.
January 7	"The Great Pretender"	The Platters	"The Great Pretender"	The Platters	"At My Front Door"	The El Dorados	
January 14	"The Great Pretender"	The Platters	"The Great Pretender"	The Platters	"Hands Off"	Priscilla Bowman with Jay McShann and his Orchestra	
January 21	"The Great Pretender"	The Platters	"The Great Pretender"	The Platters	"Hands Off"	Priscilla Bowman with Jay McShann and his Orchestra	
January 28	"The Great Pretender"	The Platters	"The Great Pretender"	The Platters	"The Great Pretender"	The Platters	
February 4	"The Great Pretender"	The Platters	"The Great Pretender"	The Platters	"The Great Pretender"	The Platters	
February 11	"The Great Pretender"	The Platters	"The Great Pretender"	The Platters	"The Great Pretender"	The Platters	
February 18	"The Great Pretender"	The Platters	"The Great Pretender"	The Platters	"The Great Pretender"	The Platters	
February 25	"The Great Pretender"	The Platters	"The Great Pretender"	The Platters	"The Great Pretender"	The Platters	
March 3	"The Great Pretender"	The Platters	"The Great Pretender"	The Platters	"The Great Pretender"	The Platters	
March 10	"The Great Pretender"	The Platters	"The Great Pretender"	The Platters	"The Great Pretender"	The Platters	
March 17	"Why Do Fools Fall in Love"	The Teenagers featuring Frankie Lymon	"The Great Pretender"	The Platters	"The Great Pretender"	The Platters	
March 24	"Why Do Fools Fall in Love"	The Teenagers featuring Frankie Lymon	"Drown in My Own Tears"	Ray Charles	"The Great Pretender"	The Platters	
March 31	"Why Do Fools Fall in Love"	The Teenagers featuring Frankie Lymon	"Why Do Fools Fall in Love"	The Teenagers featuring Frankie Lymon	"Drown in My Own Tears"	Ray Charles	
April 7	"Why Do Fools Fall in Love"	The Teenagers featuring Frankie Lymon	"Why Do Fools Fall in Love"	The Teenagers featuring Frankie Lymon	"Drown in My Own Tears"	Ray Charles	
April 14	"Why Do Fools Fall in Love"	The Teenagers featuring Frankie Lymon	"Long Tall Sally"	Little Richard	"Long Tall Sally" / "Slippin' and Slidin'"^{[a]}	Little Richard	
April 21	"Long Tall Sally" / "Slippin' and Slidin'"^{[b]}	Little Richard	"Long Tall Sally"	Little Richard	"Long Tall Sally" / "Slippin' and Slidin'"^{[a]}	Little Richard	
April 28	"Long Tall Sally" / "Slippin' and Slidin'"^{[b]}	Little Richard	"Long Tall Sally"	Little Richard	"Long Tall Sally" / "Slippin' and Slidin'"^{[a]}	Little Richard	
May 5	"Long Tall Sally" / "Slippin' and Slidin'"^{[b]}	Little Richard	"Long Tall Sally"	Little Richard	"Long Tall Sally" / "Slippin' and Slidin'"^{[a]}	Little Richard	
May 12	"Long Tall Sally" / "Slippin' and Slidin'"^{[b]}	Little Richard	"Long Tall Sally"	Little Richard	"Long Tall Sally" / "Slippin' and Slidin'"^{[a]}	Little Richard	
May 19	"Long Tall Sally" / "Slippin' and Slidin'"^{[b]}	Little Richard	"Long Tall Sally"	Little Richard	"I'm in Love Again"	Fats Domino	
May 26	"Long Tall Sally" / "Slippin' and Slidin'"^{[b]}	Little Richard	"Long Tall Sally"	Little Richard	"I'm in Love Again"	Fats Domino	
June 2	"I'm in Love Again" / "My Blue Heaven"^{[b]}	Fats Domino	"I'm in Love Again"	Fats Domino	"Long Tall Sally" / "Slippin' and Slidin'"^{[b]}	Little Richard	
June 9	"I'm in Love Again" / "My Blue Heaven"^{[b]}	Fats Domino	"I'm in Love Again"	Fats Domino	"I'm in Love Again" / "My Blue Heaven"^{[b]}	Fats Domino	
June 16	"I'm in Love Again" / "My Blue Heaven"^{[b]}	Fats Domino	"I'm in Love Again"	Fats Domino	"I'm in Love Again" / "My Blue Heaven"^{[b]}	Fats Domino	
June 23	"I'm in Love Again" / "My Blue Heaven"^{[b]}	Fats Domino	"I'm in Love Again"	Fats Domino	"I'm in Love Again" / "My Blue Heaven"^{[b]}	Fats Domino	
June 30	"I'm in Love Again" / "My Blue Heaven"^{[b]}	Fats Domino	"I'm in Love Again"	Fats Domino	"I'm in Love Again" / "My Blue Heaven"^{[b]}	Fats Domino	
July 7	"I'm in Love Again" / "My Blue Heaven"^{[b]}	Fats Domino	"I'm in Love Again"	Fats Domino	"I'm in Love Again" / "My Blue Heaven"^{[b]}	Fats Domino	
July 14	"I'm in Love Again" / "My Blue Heaven"^{[b]}	Fats Domino	"I'm in Love Again"	Fats Domino	"I'm in Love Again" / "My Blue Heaven"^{[b]}	Fats Domino	
July 21	"Fever"	Little Willie John	"Fever"	Little Willie John	"I'm in Love Again" / "My Blue Heaven"^{[b]}	Fats Domino	
July 28	"Fever"	Little Willie John	"Fever"	Little Willie John	"Treasure of Love"	Clyde McPhatter	
August 4	"Rip It Up"	Little Richard	"Fever"	Little Willie John	"I'm in Love Again"	Fats Domino	
August 11	"Rip It Up"	Little Richard	"Fever"	Little Willie John	"I'm in Love Again"	Fats Domino	
August 18	"Fever"	Little Willie John	"Fever"	Little Willie John	"My Prayer"	The Platters	
August 25	"Honky Tonk" (Parts 1 & 2)^{[b]}	Bill Doggett	"My Prayer"	The Platters	"My Prayer"	The Platters	
September 1	"Honky Tonk" (Parts 1 & 2)^{[b]}	Bill Doggett	"Let the Good Times Roll"	Shirley & Lee	"Fever"	Little Willie John	
September 8	"Honky Tonk" (Parts 1 & 2)^{[b]}	Bill Doggett	"My Prayer"	The Platters	"Let the Good Times Roll"	Shirley & Lee	
September 15	"Honky Tonk" (Parts 1 & 2)^{[b]}	Bill Doggett	"Let the Good Times Roll"	Shirley & Lee	"Don't Be Cruel" / "Hound Dog"^{[b]}	Elvis Presley	
September 22	"Honky Tonk" (Parts 1 & 2)^{[b]}	Bill Doggett	"Let the Good Times Roll"	Shirley & Lee	"Don't Be Cruel" / "Hound Dog"^{[b]}	Elvis Presley	
September 29	"Honky Tonk" (Parts 1 & 2)^{[b]}	Bill Doggett	"Honky Tonk"	Bill Doggett	"Don't Be Cruel" / "Hound Dog"^{[b]}	Elvis Presley	
October 6	"Honky Tonk" (Parts 1 & 2)^{[b]}	Bill Doggett	"Honky Tonk"	Bill Doggett	"Don't Be Cruel" / "Hound Dog"^{[b]}	Elvis Presley	
October 13	"Honky Tonk" (Parts 1 & 2)^{[b]}	Bill Doggett	"Honky Tonk"	Bill Doggett	"Let the Good Times Roll"	Shirley & Lee	
October 20	"Honky Tonk" (Parts 1 & 2)^{[b]}	Bill Doggett	"Honky Tonk"	Bill Doggett	"Honky Tonk"	Bill Doggett	
October 27	"Don't Be Cruel" / "Hound Dog"^{[b]}	Elvis Presley	"Honky Tonk"	Bill Doggett	"Don't Be Cruel" / "Hound Dog"^{[b]}	Elvis Presley	
November 3^{[c]}	"Honky Tonk" (Parts 1 & 2)^{[b]}	Bill Doggett	"Blueberry Hill"	Fats Domino	"Don't Be Cruel" / "Hound Dog"^{[b]}	Elvis Presley	
November 3^{[c]}	"Honky Tonk" (Parts 1 & 2)^{[b]}	Bill Doggett	"Blueberry Hill"	Fats Domino	"Blueberry Hill"	Fats Domino	
November 10	"Honky Tonk" (Parts 1 & 2)^{[b]}	Bill Doggett	"Blueberry Hill"	Fats Domino	"Blueberry Hill"	Fats Domino	
November 17	"Honky Tonk" (Parts 1 & 2)^{[b]}	Bill Doggett	"Blueberry Hill"	Fats Domino	"Honky Tonk"	Bill Doggett	
November 24	"Blueberry Hill"	Fats Domino	"Blueberry Hill"	Fats Domino	"Blueberry Hill"	Fats Domino	
December 1	"Honky Tonk" (Parts 1 & 2)^{[b]}	Bill Doggett	"Blueberry Hill"	Fats Domino	"Blueberry Hill"	Fats Domino	
December 8	"Blueberry Hill"	Fats Domino	"Blueberry Hill"	Fats Domino	"Blueberry Hill"	Fats Domino	
December 15	"Blueberry Hill"	Fats Domino	"Blueberry Hill"	Fats Domino	"Blueberry Hill"	Fats Domino	
December 22	"Blueberry Hill"	Fats Domino	"Blueberry Hill"	Fats Domino	"Blueberry Hill"	Fats Domino	
December 29	"Blueberry Hill"	Fats Domino	"Blueberry Hill"	Fats Domino	"Blueberry Hill"	Fats Domino	

== Notes ==
a. "Slippin' and Slidin'" not listed jointly at number one in the issue dated April 14
b. Both sides listed jointly at number one
c. Two songs tied for number one on the juke box chart.
