= Walter Livingston (architect) =

American architect (1922–2011)

Walter R. Livingston Jr.
- Born: May 21, 1922; Philadelphia, Pennsylvania, U.S.
- Died: June 8, 2011 (aged 89); Philadelphia, Pennsylvania, U.S.
- Burial place: West Laurel Hill Cemetery, Bala Cynwyd, Pennsylvania, U.S.
- Education: Cheyney University Bachelor of Science, education, 1943; University of Pennsylvania (B. Arch. 1949) (M.C.P. 1955)
- Occupation: Architect
- Spouse: Marjorie V. Cachie
- Awards: FAIA 1976
- Design: Zion Baptist Church; Triumph Baptist Church; Edison High School; The Clef Club; Criminal Justice Center

Walter R. Livingston Jr. (May 21, 1922 – June 8, 2011) was an American architect, civic activist and urban planner. His notable works include Edison/Fareira High School, the Clef Club of Jazz and Performing Arts, and the Justice Juanita Kidd Stout Center for Criminal Justice. The Zion Baptist Church in Philadelphia, designed by Livingston, was added to the National Register of Historic Places.

He served as chairman of the board for The Philadelphia Tribune and was president of the Urban League. He served on the board of the Philadelphia Redevelopment Authority from 1958 to 1972.

== Early life and education ==
Livingston was born May 21, 1992, and raised in North Philadelphia. He graduated from Central High School. He received a Bachelor of Science degree in education from Cheyney University in 1943 and a master's degree in urban planning from the University of Pennsylvania.

He served as a Sergeant in the United States Army Corps of Engineers in Europe during World War II from 1943 to 1945 and fought in the Battle of the Bulge.

He received a Bachelor's degree in architecture in 1949 and a Master's degree in city planning in 1955 from the University of Pennsylvania. He was a Chandler fellow for graduate study in city planning in 1953.

He served as a Democratic committeeman for the 46th Ward.

== Career ==
He was a practicing architect for over 55 years. He was a partner in Suer & Livingston from 1961 to 1962, Suer, Livingston, & Demas from 1962 to 1969, Livingston/Rosenwinkel, and the Livingston Group. He was a member of Eshbach, Pullinger, Stevens, & Bruder from 1969 to 1972. Notable buildings designed by his firms include Edison/Fareira High School, the Clef Club of Jazz and Performing Arts, Justice Juanita Kidd Stout Center for Criminal Justice, Triumph Baptist Church, and Zion Baptist Church. He was a fellow in the American Institute of Architects.

He served as chairman of the board for The Philadelphia Tribune and was president of the Urban League. He served on the board of the Philadelphia Redevelopment Authority from 1958 to 1972, and on the boards of the Bearean Federal Savings Bank, the Greater Philadelphia Chamber of Commerce, and the American Red Cross of Southeastern Pennsylvania. He was a member of the Union League of Philadelphia and one of the first African Americans to join that organization.

=== Awards ===
In 1994 the Philadelpha Urban League awarded him the Whitney Young Heritage Award for his contribution to the community. The Boy Scouts of America awarded him with the Silver Beaver and the Silver Antelope Awards for service on the Cradle of Liberty Council. In recognition of his contributions in public service, he was awarded the Jefferson Award by the Evening and Sunday Bulletin in 1978. In 1980 he was awarded the Leslie Pinckney Hill Centennial Recognition Citation by Cheyney University for his contributions in the fields of architecture and city planning.

== Personal life ==
In 1952, Livingston married Marjorie V. Cachie and together they had four children. He owned four houses on Locust Street in Philadelphia where he lived.

He died June 8, 2011, at his home in Philadelphia due to complications from a stroke. He was interred at West Laurel Hill Cemetery in Bala Cynwyd, Pennsylvania.

== Legacy ==
In 2011, after his death, Livingston's family were presented with the Ephraim D. Saunders award for Livingston's community service.

The Zion Baptist Church in Philadelphia, designed by Livingston, was added to the National Register of Historic Places.
