= Carl Pruitt =

American jazz musician

Carl Briggs Pruitt (June 3, 1918, Birmingham, Alabama – June 1977) was an American jazz and blues double-bassist.

Pruitt began his career as a pianist, but switched to bass in 1937. He played briefly in Pittsburgh and worked in the 1940s with Roy Eldridge, the Jeter-Pillars Orchestra, Lucky Millinder, Maxine Sullivan, Cootie Williams, and Mary Lou Williams. In the 1950s he did some touring, with Earl Hines and the Sauter-Finegan Orchestra, but was active mostly as a sideman and session musician for recordings, including with Shorty Baker, Arnett Cobb, Eddie "Lockjaw" Davis, Bill Doggett, Wynonie Harris, Bull Moose Jackson, Roland Kirk, George Shearing, Sahib Shihab, and Hal Singer.

Pruitt did not perform or record frequently in the 1960s or 1970s, though he did play with Woody Herman at the Montreux Jazz Festival in 1967 and record with Ray Nance in 1969. He did a tour in France with Doc Cheatham and Sammy Price in 1975.

== Discography ==
With James Brown

- Please Please Please (King, 1958)
- Try Me! (King, 1959)

With Bill Doggett

- Everybody Dance the Honky Tonk (King, 1956)
- Doggett Beat for Dancing Feet (King, 1957)
- Dance Awhile with Doggett (King, 1958)

With Neil Sedaka

- Rock with Sedaka (RCA Victor, 1959)
