= Floyd "Candy" Johnson =

American jazz musician (1922–1981)

Floyd "Candy" Johnson (May 1, 1922, in Madison, Illinois – June 28, 1981, in Framingham, Massachusetts) was an American jazz saxophonist.

== Career ==
Johnson started on drums before moving to saxophone. His professional career began in St. Louis, where he was a member of a group led by Chuck Finney. He attended Wilberforce University until the draft intervened. After his service, he played in bands led by Ernie Fields, Tiny Bradshaw, and Andy Kirk. With the Kirk orchestra he recorded for Decca Records. He cites Ben Webster as his biggest influence.

Johnson preferred candy to alcohol, so a band member started calling him "Candy". In Detroit he started a band called the Peppermint Sticks. One musician recalled that the band dressed in candy-striped suits, and sometimes Johnson tossed peppermint sticks to the crowd.

In 1951 he was a member of the Count Basie Orchestra, recording with Basie for Clef Records, then began working in more of a rhythm and blues vein with Bill Doggett. The band had hits with "Blip Blop", "Honky Tonk", and "Night Train". He left Doggett in the 1960s to study music at Bowling Green State University.

In 1974, he played with the Duke Ellington Orchestra, the Count Basie Orchestra, and his friend Clark Terry. During a visit to New York City, he recorded with Helen Humes and Roy Eldridge. A year later, he accompanied the New McKinney's Cotton Pickers at the Bix Beiderbecke Festival in Iowa.

When Johnson retired, he moved to Toledo and taught at local schools.

== Discography ==
=== As leader ===
- Candy's Mood, with Milt Buckner, Clarence "Gatemouth" Brown (Black & Blue, 1973)
- The Midnight Slows, Vol. 3, with Milt Buckner, Arnett Cobb (Black & Blue, 1973)
- Candy's Mood (The Definitive Black & Blue Sessions) (Black & Blue, 1997)

=== As sideman ===
With Count Basie

- The Count! (Clef, 1955)
- Basie Plays Hefti (1958)
- The Quintessence New York – Chicago – Hollywood, Vol. 2: 1942–1952 (2003)
- The Complete Clef/Verve Count Basie Fifties Studio Recordings (2005)

With Bill Doggett

- Dance Awhile with Doggett (King, 1958)

With Helen Humes

- Let the Good Times Roll (Black & Blue, 1973)
