= Wow! (Bill Doggett album) =

Studio album by Bill Doggett
- Released: January 1965
- Recorded: 1964; October 31 (tracks 1, 3, 5, 6) and November 17 (tracks 2, 4, 7 to 9)
- Studio: Bell Sound (New York City)
- Genre: Blues
- Length: 46:03
- Label: ABC-Paramount
- Producer: Sid Feller

Bill Doggett chronology
Finger-tips (1963)	Wow! (1965)

Professional ratings
Review scores
Source	Rating
AllMusic	2.5/5 stars
Record Mirror	3/5 stars

Wow! is 1965 album by American organist Bill Doggett.

== Track listing ==
All tracks composed by Bill Doggett; except where indicated

1. "Wow!" – 2:36
2. "Oo-Da" – 3:52
3. "Ol' Mose Blues" – 8:06
4. "Happy Soul Time" – 2:48
5. "The Kicker" – 2:42
6. "Mudcat" – 2:36
7. "Ram-Bunk-Shush" (Henry Glover, Lucky Millinder, Jimmy Mundy) – 3:12
8. "Slow Walk" (Sil Austin, Irv Siders) – 3:35
9. "Fatso" – 4:39

== Personnel ==
- Bill Doggett - organ
- Andy Ennis – baritone saxophone, tenor saxophone
- Elvin Shepard - alto saxophone
- Billy Butler, Lamar McDaniels – guitar
- Al Lucas – double bass
- Emmet J. Spencer – drums
- Charles Hatcher - percussion
