= W.O. Smith =

W.O. Smith may refer to:

- William Orlando Smith (1859–1932), U. S. journalist and politician
- William Oscar Smith (1917–1991), jazz double bassist
- Bill Smith (jazz musician) (born 1926), American clarinetist and composer
