= Guitar Soul! =

Studio album by Billy Butler
- Released: 1969
- Recorded: September 22, 1969
- Studio: Van Gelder Studio, Englewood Cliffs, New Jersey
- Genre: Jazz
- Length: 35:43
- Label: Prestige; PR 7734
- Producer: Bob Porter

Billy Butler chronology
This Is Billy Butler! (1968)	Guitar Soul! (1969)	Yesterday, Today & Tomorrow (1970)

Guitar Soul! is the second album by guitarist Billy Butler which was recorded in 1969 and released on the Prestige label.

== Reception ==
Professional ratings
Review scores
Source	Rating
Allmusic	4/5 stars

Alex Henderson of Allmusic calls the album a "creative triumph" and states "Guitar Soul reflects Butler's diversity".

== Track listing ==
1. "Blow for the Crossing" (Charles Black, Billy Butler) - 9:27
2. "Golden Earrings" (Ray Evans, Jay Livingston, Victor Young) - 4:04
3. "The Thumb" (Wes Montgomery) - 4:16
4. "Honky Tonk" (Billy Butler, Bill Doggett, Clifford Scott, Shep Shepherd) - 5:46
5. "B & B Calypso" (Bob Bushnell) - 3:00
6. "Seven Come Eleven" (Charlie Christian) - 5:43
7. "Autumn Nocturne/You Go to My Head" (Kim Gannon, Josef Myrow/J. Fred Coots, Haven Gillespie) - 3:27
- Recorded at Van Gelder Studio in Englewood Cliffs, New Jersey on September 22, 1969

== Personnel ==
- Billy Butler - guitar, bass guitar, acoustic guitar
- Seldon Powell - varitone, tenor saxophone, flute
- Sonny Phillips - organ
- Bob Bushnell - electric bass
- Specs Powell - drums
