= Shep Shepherd =

American musical artist (1917–2018)

- Born: Berisford Shepherd; January 19, 1917; Honduras
- Died: November 25, 2018 (aged 101)
- Genres: Jazz
- Occupations: Musician, composer, singer, music copyist, music arranger, woodworker, security
- Labels: King Records, RCA Victor, RCA Camden

Berisford “Shep” Shepherd (January 19, 1917 – November 25, 2018), was an American multi-instrumental jazz musician, composer and singer.

== Beginnings ==
Shepherd's father Charlie Shepherd was an engineer from the West Indies working to build the Panama Canal when Shepherd was conceived. His father sent his mother by ship to New Orleans, intending she continue Philadelphia to live with relatives there. Shepherd was born in Honduras during the journey, and then raised in first a Jewish neighborhood and later a black neighborhood in Philadelphia.

He had an early fascination with marching bands, drumming on tables and chairs until his mother bought him a toy drum to save wear and tear on the furniture. He attended the Jules E. Mastbaum Area Conservatory and Vocational School where he trained as a percussionist on timpani, vibraphone, xylophone, snare and bass drums. Students were required to have a secondary instrument, Shepherd's was trombone. He also trained as a cabinet maker. He initially hoped for a career in the Philadelphia Orchestra, but then his interest shifted to jazz. He also formed a friendship with drummer Jimmy Crawford, who was able to help his career in New York.

== Career ==
In the 1930s, Shepherd performed with Jimmy Gorham's band in Philadelphia.

=== New York ===
In 1941, Benny Carter contacted Shepherd after hearing him play, and this resulted in Shepherd working for Carter and eventually moving to New York City. Shepherd also started working for Artie Shaw in 1941.

When he was leaving Philadelphia, his mother advised him, "Beris, you find out what they want and you give it to them!" Shepherd explained in a 2018 interview, "That meant, don’t just fasten myself down with jazz alone. Play whatever kind of music comes along. And that’s what I did.” In New York, Shepherd was in heavy demand and the phrase "Get Shep!" became a phrase among area musicians.

=== Military service and touring musician ===
Shepherd was in the U.S. Army for four years, serving in the entertainment corps, and working there improved his skills as a composer and arranger. Since the army had enough drummers, Shepherd also played trombone and trained drummers.

While in the Army, he married his first wife, Pearl E. Timberlake, and they were together for over thirty years until she predeceased him in 1996. Together they had three children.

In the Army, Shepherd met Billy Butler, and was best man at his wedding, and in 1952, after his military service, Shepherd began working with Butler as part of Bill Doggett's group. In 1956, Shepherd helped write Doggett's signature song, Honky Tonk. By the late 1990s, over 40 years later, Shepherd was still receiving enough royalties from this song to pay his phone bill.

=== Return to New York and move to California ===
Shepherd left Doggett's group in 1959 and returned to New York, where he worked in pit orchestras for Broadway shows, and as a music copyist and arranger.

In 1964, Jimmy Crawford accepted a job from Sammy Davis Jr. and arranged for Shepherd to take over his orchestra role on the Broadway musical Here's Love. When the show closed on Broadway, Shepherd was invited to participate as one of two musicians on a nationwide tour of the show. Shepherd and the conductor traveled from city to city with the cast, but for each stop on the tour a local group of 27 musicians was hired to be the pit orchestra and perform onstage musician roles, and Shepherd had to train them for their roles.

When the tour ended, Shepherd found himself in San Francisco, and became a freelance musician there.

=== Finnochio's Club ===
In the late 1960s or early 1970s, Shepherd was alternating drum duties with Dave Black in the Chris Ibanez Trio. Black wanted steady employment while his son was in high school, so he left the trio to take a job as the drummer for the house band at Finocchio's Club. Shepherd took over all drum work for the Ibanez Trio, and also worked security for a building in the financial district. After Black's son finished high school, Black was ready to move on and offered Shepherd the job at Finocchio's.

From 1973 until 1995, Shepherd was the drummer for the house band, a piano, drum and saxophone trio, at Finocchio's Club, a nightclub with drag queen entertainment in San Francisco. This was a Musician's Union gig five to six nights a week, meaning a steady paycheck and benefits including paying in to Social Security. In 1995, Finocchio's stopped using live musicians.

== Later life ==
Now nearly 80 years old, Shepherd switched his primary focus from drums to trombone, claiming that it was easier to carry. In 1995, he and Art Harris formed the group "Blues Fuse", with Harris playing Hammond Organ and singing, and Robert Labbe on drums and they regularly performed in San Francisco through at least 2000 and released at least one CD.

In the early 2000s, Shep moved to Orange County in Southern California, performing locally with Jerry Velasco. On his 91st birthday, he married his third wife, Joy.

He turned 100 in January 2017, and performed at Saddleback College in Mission Viejo, California.

=== Death and legacy ===
He died in November 2018 at the age of 101.

Musicians Shepherd worked with included Patti Page, Lionel Hampton, Lena Horne, The Ward Singers, Earl Bostic, Buck Clayton, Odetta, as well as Cab Calloway, Sy Oliver, Big Maybelle, and Erskine Hawkins. Shep Shepherd is listed in The Biographical Encyclopedia of Jazz and Who’s Who Among Black Americans.

== Discography ==
With Bill Doggett

- Everybody Dance the Honky Tonk (King, 1956)
- Hot Doggett (King, 1957)
- Moon Dust (King, 1957)
- Dame Dreaming (King, 1957)
- A Salute to Ellington (King, 1957)
- Doggett Beat for Dancing Feet (King, 1957)
- Dance Awhile with Doggett (King, 1958)

With Artie Shaw

- Any Old Time (RCA Victor, 1958)
- One Night Stand (RCA Camden, 1963)

With others

- Dizzy Gillespie, The Original Dizzy Gillespie Big Band in Concert (Vocalion, 1963)
- Little Willie John, Fever (King, 1956)
- Odetta, Odetta and the Blues (Riverside, 1962)
- Joya Sherrill, Joya Sherrill Sings Duke (20th Century Fox, 1965)
