= Everybody Dance the Honky Tonk =

Studio album by Bill Doggett
- Released: 1956
- Recorded: May 19, 1954, January 12 & June 16, 1956, September 18 and October 12 & 29, 1956
- Studio: Cincinnati, OH and New York City, NY
- Length: 34:22
- Label: King; King 531

Bill Doggett chronology
As You Desire Me (1956)	Everybody Dance the Honky Tonk (1956)	Dame Dreaming (1957)

Everybody Dance the Honky Tonk is an album by American organist Bill Doggett released by the King label in 1956.

== Reception ==
Professional ratings
Review scores
Source	Rating
AllMusic	4.5/5 stars

AllMusic reviewer Bill Dahl stated "This hugely influential jazz-laced R&B quartet plays their classic two-part instrumentals and several more groovers".

== Track listing ==
1. "Honky Tonk (Part 1)" (Bill Doggett, Billy Butler, Clifford Scott, Shep Shepherd) – 3:04
2. "Honky Tonk (Part 2)" (Doggett, Butler, Scott, Shepherd) – 2:36
3. "On the Sunny Side of the Street" (Jimmy McHugh, Dorothy Fields) – 2:54
4. "Afternoon Jump" (B. Red Ellis) – 2:51
5. "Peacock Alley" (Butler) – 2:36
6. "Big Boy" (Bill Jennings) – 3:08
7. "Slow Walk" (Sil Austin) – 2:34
8. "Nothin' Yet" (Ellis) – 3:41
9. "When Your Lover Has Gone" (Einar Aaron Swan) – 2:44
10. "Honky Tonk Number Three" (Doggett, Butler, Scott, Shepherd) – 2:44
11. "Leaps and Bounds" (Scott, Ellis, Butler, Shepherd) – 5:30
- Recorded in Cincinnati, OH on May 19, 1954 (track 4), September 18, 1956 (track 11), October 12, 1956 (tracks 5 & 10) and October 29, 1956 (tracks 6–8), and New York City, NY on January 12, 1956 (track 9), June 16, 1956 (tracks 1–3)

== Personnel ==
- Bill Doggett – organ
- Clifford Scott – tenor saxophone, alto saxophone (tracks 1–3 & 5–11)
- Irving "Skinny" Brown – tenor saxophone (track 4)
- Clifford Bush (track 4), Billy Butler (tracks 1–3 & 5–11), John Faire (tracks 5–8, 10 & 11) – guitar
- Edwyn Conley (tracks 5–8 & 10), Al Lucas (track 9), Carl Pruitt (tracks 1–3), Clarence Mack (track 4) - bass
- Shep Shepherd – drums
- Tommy Brown – vocals, maracas, claves (tracks 6–8)
