= Clifford Scott (musician) =

American jazz musician (1928–1993)

Clifford Donley Scott (June 21, 1928 – April 19, 1993), born and raised in San Antonio, Texas, was an American saxophonist and flautist who played in jazz, blues, and R&B idioms.

Scott started as a drummer in a family band and also learned to play piano and violin before picking up clarinet as a teenager. He played in a house band led by James Hopkins at San Antonio's Avalon Grill in the late 1940s, then worked with Amos Milburn, Jay McShann, Lionel Hampton, Roy Brown, and Roy Milton. In 1955 he began working with Bill Doggett, and was a prominent soloist on many of Doggett's most famous recordings, including "Honky Tonk". He also recorded as a leader in the late 1950s and early 1960s and worked as a session musician for rock, pop, and R&B recordings. In the 1960s he worked with Sonny Thompson, Jimmy Witherspoon, Gerald Wilson, Onzy Matthews, and Frank Butler, and was a member of Ray Charles's ensemble from 1966 to 1968 and again in 1970. Late in his career he worked primarily locally in San Antonio, playing with George Prado and Jim Cullum, Jr.

== Discography ==
=== As leader ===
- Out Front (Pacific Jazz, 1963)
- The Big Ones (World Pacific, 1963)
- Lavender Sax (World Pacific, 1964)
- Mr. Honky Tonk Is Back in Town (New Rose, 1992)
- Texas Tenor (ROIR, 1992)

=== As sideman ===
With Bill Doggett

- Everybody Dance the Honky Tonk (King, 1956)
- Dame Dreaming (King, 1957)
- A Salute to Ellington (King, 1957)
- Doggett Beat for Dancing Feet (King, 1957)
- Dance Awhile with Doggett (King, 1958)
- On Tour (King, 1959)

With Freddie King

- Freddy King Sings (King, 1961)
- Let's Hide Away and Dance Away with Freddy King (King, 1961)
- Gives You a Bonanza of Instrumentals (King, 1965)

With others

- Bobby Bland, The Definitive Collection (Geffen, 2007)
- James Brown, Please, Please, Please (King, 1959)
- James Brown, Try Me! (King, 1959)
- Roy Brown, Hard Times (Bluesway, 1973)
- Ray Charles, My Kind of Jazz (Tangerine, 1970)
- Rita Coolidge, Rita Coolidge (A&M, 1971)
- Jesse Ed Davis, Keep Me Comin' (Epic, 1973)
- Bobby Day, Rockin' Robin (1959)
- Gil Fuller, Night Flight (Pacific Jazz, 1966)
- Lionel Hampton, Lionel Hampton (Contemporary, 1955)
- Richard Groove Holmes, Somethin' Special (Pacific Jazz, 1962)
- Charles Kynard, Where It's At! (Pacific Jazz, 1963)
- Little Willie John, Fever (King, 1956)
- Onzy Matthews, Blues with a Touch of Elegance (Capitol, 1964)
- Onzy Matthews, Sounds for the 60s! (Capitol, 1966)
- Bob Neuwirth, Bob Neuwirth (Asylum, 1974)
- Jimmy Witherspoon, Evenin' Blues (Stateside, 1964)
