= Bessemer, Virginia =

Unincorporated community in Virginia, United States

Bessemer
- Unincorporated community
- Location within the Commonwealth of Virginia Bessemer (the United States)
- Coordinates: 37°38′49″N 79°48′40″W
- Country: United States
- State: Virginia
- County: Botetourt
- Time zone: UTC−5 (Eastern (EST))
  - Summer (DST): UTC−4 (EDT)

Bessemer is an unincorporated community in Botetourt County, Virginia, United States. It was the birthplace of labor leader Frank Fairfax.
