= Frank Fairfax =

American jazz musician and union organizer (1899–1972)

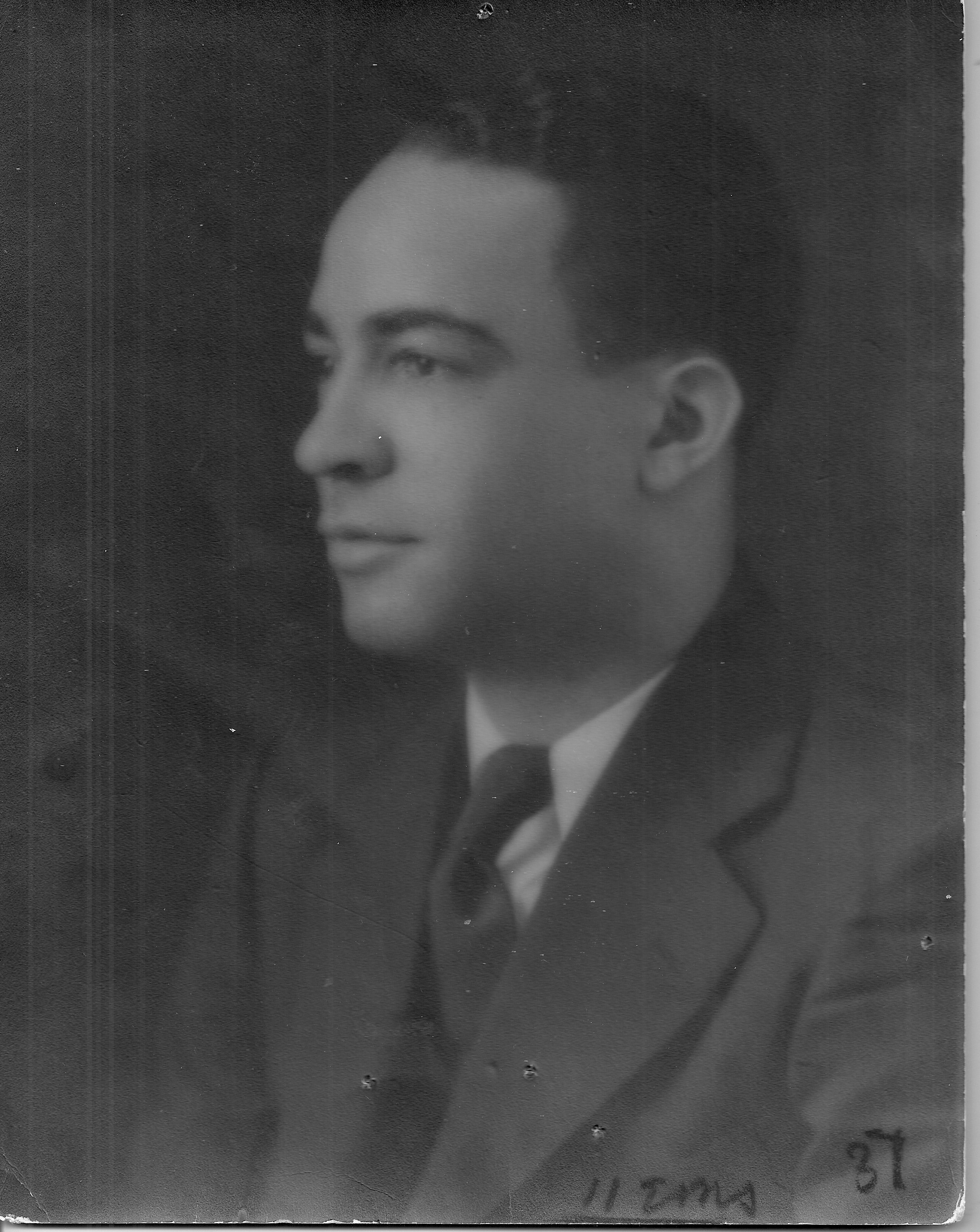
Frank Thurmond Fairfax

Frank Thurmond Fairfax (25 November 1899 – 25 January 1972) was the organizer of Philadelphia's Protective Union Local 274 (1935–1971), a charter of the American Federation of Musicians (AFM/AFofM) for black musicians. Fairfax was also a bandleader, musician, music arranger and songwriter, performing in Philadelphia and other northeastern cities.

== Background ==
Born in Bessemer, Virginia on November 25, 1899, Frank Thurmond Fairfax was sixth of the eleven offspring of Matthew L. Fairfax, a preacher, and Maria Elizabeth Cash. The family later moved to Huntington, West Virginia. Frank Fairfax worked his way through West Virginia State College and earned his B.S. degree in Business Administration in the spring of 1921. While attending college, he joined the Alpha Phi Alpha fraternity and became active in vocal and instrumental groups, studying under Clarence Cameron White. He learned to play the trumpet, trombone, tenor saxophone, and drums.

== Career ==
When Frank Sr. joined Phil Edwards' Collegians, a West Virginia territory touring orchestra, in 1929, he left his family with his mother and some siblings in Huntington, West Virginia. His wife and children joined him when he settled in Philadelphia in 1935.

=== Organizer of Protective Union Local 274 ===
During the summer of 1933, Edwards' Collegians migrated to Pennsylvania for a dance tour. Upon arriving in Philadelphia in the fall of 1933, the band signed for a steady gig at The Rafters in West Philadelphia and "ran straight into union trouble." This was a Union band, carrying "Conditional Membership" cards from the American Federation of Musicians. Fairfax, the band's manager, found union recognition in this area unfavorable to black musicians. He wrote, "The musicians needed new union cards. The dues of (white) Local 77, AFM were then $15 a year, over and above a stiff initiation fee that the members of Edward's Collegians simply could not afford. Each musician received only $3 for a night's work."

Frank Fairfax contacted the president and secretary of the American Federation of Musicians: Joe Weber and William J. Kerngood, respectively, and after much discussion, was authorized to organize a new local in Philadelphia. Fairfax was instructed to secure the names and addresses of at least 75 interested (black) musicians. Damon Fisher, James Shorter, Harry Monroe, F. E. Walker, and a few others assisted him in recruiting the musicians to make the required number for the charter.

After negotiations between Fairfax, Kerngood and the president of Local 77, the white union which claimed as members among many others, all the musicians of the world renowned Philadelphia Orchestra, it was agreed that a charter would be granted under certain conditions satisfactory to Local 77 (prices, etc. must be the same) when $2.00 from each of the 75 musicians was collected and tendered.

During the last few days of 1934, Fairfax received the charter, local seal and all other necessary materials for starting the new Local 274. He called the first meeting for nomination of officers (2nd floor, Little Harlem Bar, 400 block of south 18th Street). The charter was dated for January 6, 1935. Fairfax acted as chairman for this meeting. Their first election was held at the YMCA, 1924 Christian Street. Below are the elected officers of the new Local:

- President............................George W. Hyder
- Vice President....................Harry Monroe
- Secretary............................Frank Fairfax
- Assistant Secretary.............Harold Allen
- Treasurer............................Wesley Fitzgerald
- Sergeant-at-arms................Damon Fisher

The configuration of officers changed periodically, throughout the duration of Local 274's existence, and Fairfax always held official positions, including president but primarily executive secretary. Regarding union membership, bass player William Oscar Smith wrote, "The union opened an entire new dimension for the expansion and recognition of our art. I was one of the charter members of Local 274, American Federation of Musicians. Little did I realize the impact that membership would have on the rest of my life."

Local 274 received many commendations from civic and community groups for outstanding work, even, on numerous occasions, by the Federation itself, for running an organized and "good" Local. Throughout the years, Local 274's conduct was considered "exemplary" and their efforts on the part of the Federation were well recognized.

During the post 1964 era of widespread desegregation under federal law, the AFofM was targeted by the AFL-CIO as one of the nation's most segregated labor organizations. One by one, black musicians’ unions in cities such as Pittsburgh, Detroit and Chicago were forced to merge with their respective local white unions.

In 1966, members of Local 274, under the leadership of their president James 'Jimmy' Adams, created the Clef Club, a separate entity but the "social arm" of Local 274. It had its own charter and its own liquor license. When, in 1968, the American Federation of Musicians handed down an order requiring Local 274 to disband and merge with Philadelphia Local 77, the members of Local 274 vigorously resisted the order, contending that their local, unlike the white local, never had refused to accept members because of race and that 274 was, in fact, already integrated. When the predominantly black local refused to obey the order to merge, The executive board of the AFofM ordered its expulsion in March, 1971. Subsequently, Local 274's officials filed a legal action in U.S. District Court seeking an injunction to restrain their expulsion from the AFofM on the grounds that such a merger "would deprive its members of control of their own affairs, their meeting house and their clubhouse liquor license." However, in April, 1971, Judge Edward R. Becker stayed the March, 1971 expulsion. In his 23-page opinion refusing Local 274's plea to invalidate the expulsion, Judge Becker pointed out that Philadelphia was the last of the 37 cities to end dual unionism based on race in the musicians' field.

Local 274's President Jimmy Adams prevailed in court against Local 77 when the latter sought to absorb all the assets of Local 274 when its charter was revoked in the spring of 1970. Instead of those assets going to Local 77, they went to the Philadelphia Clef Club, which eventually purchased a building on 13th and Washington Ave. In 1995 the Philadelphia Clef Club moved to its current location at Broad and Fitzwater Streets on Philadelphia Avenue of the Arts.

Following the expulsion of Local 274 from the AFofM in April, 1971, the musicians from Local 274 eventually joined Local 77, which, according to Diane Turner Ph.D., diminished Black musicians' power and status in the music industry.

In May, 1971, Frank Fairfax moved to Local 77, AFofM and began serving as Assistant to the Project Chairman of the Music Performance Trust Fund. Concurrently, he served as Secretary of the Philadelphia Clef Club of the Performing Arts, Inc. until his death.

=== Musician ===
Frank Fairfax's documented career as a professional musician began in 1928, when he played bass horn and trumpet alongside singer/trombonist Clyde Bernhardt (1905–1986) and many other musicians in Henry P. McClane's Society Orchestra, a West Virginia-based dance band. From July, 1929 through 1934, Fairfax was playing trombone for Phil Edwards' Collegians, a college dancing orchestra formed in 1928 in Bluefield, West Virginia, that toured the Eastern seaboard. At some point in the first half of 1930, Edwards' Collegians landed a job as the house band for Cincinnati's Greystone Ballroom, from whence it regularly broadcast over WLW for a least eighteen months. Such was its reputation that in 1931 it earned eighth place in the Pittsburgh Courier's Most Popular Band Contest, a consequence, at least in part, of its presence on the airwaves. In 1932 and 1933, still led by Phil Edwards but managed by Frank Fairfax, the Collegians made an extensive tour of the southeastern United States. According to Cleophas "Chico Hicks, who played banjo and guitar for the band beginning in 1932, Fairfax took a large role in the booking and business management of the Collegians. The group's representative would travel ahead of the orchestra to different towns to find bookings, and then would meet with Fairfax, who would configure the schedule. Hicks also recalled that the group embarked on an extensive tour of the eastern United States, extending down the East Coast into the Deep South, through Georgia, Florida, Alabama, Mississippi, Louisiana, Texas, and Arkansas. Crisscrossing the region between performances at country clubs, dance halls, and local radio stations, the orchestra traveled in two 1926 Packards and a "Chevy cattle truck," which carried most of the instruments. Fairfax and Hicks usually rode in the truck. Fairfax also wrote some of the music arrangements for Edwards' Collegians. However, a significant portion of the Collegians' repertoire consisted of Archie Bleyer's stock arrangements ordered from New York, including "Too Tired," "Muddy Water," "Just Around the Corner, Smoke Gets in Your Eyes, and Dvorak's "Humoresque." Being able to sight-read new tunes was an important component of performing with the band. By September 1933, Chappie Willet assumed leadership of the band, and subsequently it relocated the Philadelphia. They landed a steady job at the Rafters Club in West Philadelphia. Fairfax remained business manager and was first trombonist in Chappie Willet's Orchestra in Philadelphia and also while performing with the same band on the campus of Princeton University in March, 1934. By late 1934 the band broke up.

=== Bandleader ===
By December 1934, after Chappie Willet's band disbanded, Fairfax was leading his own band, called the Frankie Fairfax Campus Club Orchestra. A Philadelphia Tribune published an announcement of Fairfax's upcoming performance at the O. V. Catto Elks Lodge Hall on December 20, 1934. The band was said to be "creating a new sensation among the younger club set." Fairfax soon returned to The Rafters, where his band had a violin trio, a trumpet quartet, trombone quartet, sax and clarinet quartet, and a very polished vocal ensemble. Other engagements for Frankie Fairfax's band (its name would change many times, depending upon the venue) included Ubangi Club, Parrish Cafe, Oasis Ballroom, the Kit Kat, Club Logan, social club parties, charity balls, sorority and fraternity dances, private affairs, including a reception for the President of the Republic of Liberia and the President-elect of Liberia. But according to William Oscar Smith, the bass player for the Frankie Fairfax Orchestra from 1935 to 1937, the band's home base was the Strand Ballroom in South Philadelphia. Smith describes the band in his book: "The band was just right in its blend of older experienced musicians and young lions. The veterans included Whitey Grove and Pete Brown on trumpets; Tasso Richardson and Nelson Wapler, saxophones; Fairfax and Bert Claggett, trombones. John Berry, tenor sax, and Bert Hall, drums, were of intermediate age. Ably led by the elders, the younger guys reaped the benefits of going on to make names for themselves, not only in Philadelphia but in New York, Chicago, and later the West Coast. They were Dizzy Gillespie, Charlie Shavers, Johnny Lynch, Carl 'Bama' Warwick, and Palmer Davis on trumpets; Harold Reed, John Brown, and Shorty Cawthon on saxophones; Calvin Jackson and Ernie Washington on piano; and Norman Dibble and Shadow Wilson on drums." Other well-known musicians that performed in Fairfax's band were John Hamilton and Bill Doggett. The Frankie Fairfax Band was heard on the airwaves from Philadelphia radio station WDAS. However, no recordings were made.

William Oscar Smith wrote, "Rehearsals were a joy. Everybody was there at least an hour ahead of time. We were discovering each other, and, best of all, we were discovering music. We learned to play hard tunes with difficult chord changes. We played these challenging tunes starting in the original key and proceeding a half step up each chorus until we returned to the original key. Imagine playing tunes like "Body and Soul," "Sweet and Lovely," and "Smoke gets in Your Eyes" in this fashion. If nothing else, a few weeks of this would give you control of your ax (your horn, or whatever you were playing). A year of this with frequent rehearsals and gigs would put anybody at the top of his game. This band did not play stock arrangements; we played only our own written or "head arrangements." With head or ear arrangements, we built up a repertoire in which no written music would be in sight... What we usually got was a crowd-pleaser. We gave them titles like "The Uptown Breakaway," "The Broadway Stomp," or "The Ridge Avenue Shuffle."

A lengthy strike in 1938 at the Nixon Grand Theater, where Fairfax's orchestra was the band, was the beginning of the end for that 12-piece work of art. Some of the regulars drifted to other jobs and the draft boards soon picked away at the survivors. For the remainder of Fairfax's musical career, he formed smaller combos: quartets or trios, under different names. In 1943, he formed The Frankie Fairfax Masters of Rhythm; in 1947, Frankie Fairfax's Cracker Jacks played at the North Philly bar, The Web, The Musical Bar, and in mainstem houses in north and south New Jersey. The pianist was Marian Murphy; bass player, "Sneaky Pete" Briggs; guitarist, Roosevelt Sherman or Dick Hill, and Frankie played tenor saxophone, trombone, trumpet, and bongo drums.

Also in the 1940s, Frankie Fairfax and his Trio played at O’Shea's Wagon Wheel in Harrisburg, PA. and at the Hi Hat Cafe. Frankie Fairfax's last engagement as a working musician was in December, 1971 at a Model Cities Christmas party at Girard College.

== Personal life and death ==
Frank married Kathryn Ione Adams, daughter of Dr. Arthur Stewart Adams and Mary Leota Taylor Adams in 1925. Their offspring were Dolores Anita Fairfax and Frank Thurmond Fairfax, Jr.

On January 25, 1972, at the age of 72, Frank T. Fairfax died in Hahnemann Hospital, of pneumonia and complications attending his cardiac condition. Members and officers of Consumers Education and Protective Association International Inc. (CEPA) expressed their deep regrets and sorrow at the passing of Mr. Frank Fairfax, a devoted CEPA member and Treasurer of the West Oak Lane Branch. Mr. Fairfax was always ready to respond to the call of any consumer in need of the organization's assistance.

A delegation of CEPA members led by Mr. Garland Dempsey, International President Max Weiner, executive director, attended the services held on January 30 at the Emmanuel Johnson Funeral Home. The Rev. J. Quinton Jackson, pastor of Mt. Zion Baptist Church, Germantown, officiated for the services, and Dr W. Cholmondeley, of St Paul's Church, Plainfield N. J., assisted. (6) Musicians that had been friends and co-workers supplied soft music during the funeral services. Some of the local musicians on hand were Charlie Gaines, LeRoy Bostic, Jimmy Shorter, Agnew Gary, Danny McCune and Thomas Fleming, who directed the group. Also present were Douglas Holman, Herbert Alvis, Sylvester Nash, Jimmy Adams, H. Lee Nelson, Alfonso Coverdale, Arthur Russell, Eugene Scott, Selmer Payne, Ernie Ranson, Curtis Wilder, Howard Pettis, James Gorham, Skeet McLane, and Raymond Proctor. Family members in attendance were his wife, Kathryn, his daughter, Dolores Fairfax Mathias, and his son, Frank T. Fairfax Jr. Interment was held at Hillside Cemetery.
