= A Salute to Ellington =

Studio album by Bill Doggett
- Released: 1957
- Recorded: December 18 & 19, 1956
- Studio: Cincinnati, Ohio
- Length: 35:48
- Label: King; King 533

Bill Doggett chronology
Dame Dreaming (1957)	A Salute to Ellington (1957)	Doggett Beat for Dancing Feet (1957)

A Salute to Ellington is an album by American organist Bill Doggett released by the King label in 1957.

Professional ratings
Review scores
Source	Rating
AllMusic	4.5/5 stars

== Track listing ==
1. "Caravan" (Juan Tizol, Duke Ellington, Irving Mills) – 2:20
2. "Prelude to a Kiss" (Ellington, Irving Gordon, Mills) – 2:34
3. "I'm Just a Lucky So and So" (Ellington, Mack David) – 3:50
4. "Solitude" (Ellington, Eddie DeLange, Mills) – 3:44
5. "I Let a Song Go Out of My Heart" (Ellington, Henry Nemo, John Redmond, Mills) – 2:29
6. "Don't Get Around Much Anymore" (Ellington, Bob Russell) – 2:18
7. "I Got It Bad and That Ain't Good" (Ellington, Paul Francis Webster) – 5:04
8. "Don't You Know I Care" (Ellington, Mack David) – 2:43
9. "C Jam Blues" (Ellington) – 2:21
10. "Sophisticated Lady" (Ellington, Mitchell Parish, Mills) – 2:49
11. "Satin Doll" (Ellington, Billy Strayhorn) – 3:07
12. "Perdido" (Tizol, Ellington, Ervin Drake, Hans Lengsfelder) – 2:29

== Personnel ==
- Bill Doggett – organ
- Clifford Scott – tenor saxophone, alto saxophone, flute
- Billy Butler – guitar
- Shep Shepherd – drums
