= Dame Dreaming =

Studio album by Bill Doggett
- Released: 1957
- Recorded: December 16, 1953 and December 20 & 21, 1956
- Studio: Cincinnati, OH
- Length: 31:38
- Label: King; King 532

Bill Doggett chronology
Everybody Dance the Honky Tonk (1956)	Dame Dreaming (1957)	A Salute to Ellington (1957)

Dame Dreaming, also known as Dame Dreaming with Bill Doggett, is an album by American organist Bill Doggett released by the King label in 1957.

== Critical reception ==
Professional ratings
Review scores
Source	Rating
AllMusic	3/5 stars

AllMusic reviewer Myles Boisen stated "This was one of Bill Doggett's smooth 'n' easy recordings ... don't expect anything that will rattle the ice cubes in your martini".

== Track listing ==
1. "Sweet Lorraine" (Cliff Burwell, Mitchell Parish) – 2:23
2. "Diane" (Ernö Rapée, Lew Pollack) – 2:48
3. "Dinah" (Harry Akst, Sam M. Lewis, Joe Young) – 2:45
4. "Ramona" (L. Wolfe Gilbert, Mabel Wayne) – 2:17
5. "Cherry" (Don Redman, Ray Gilbert) – 3:04
6. "Cynthia" (Jack Owens, Earl Gish, Billy White) – 2:35
7. "Jeannine" (Nathaniel Shilkret, Gilbert) – 2:23
8. "Tangerine" (Victor Schertzinger, Johnny Mercer) – 2:54
9. "Nancy" (Jimmy Van Heusen, Phil Silvers) – 2:47
10. "Estrellita" (Manuel Ponce, Frank La Forge) – 2:47
11. "Laura" (David Raksin, Johnny Mercer) – 2:54
12. "Marcheta" (Victor Schertzinger) – 2:01

== Personnel ==
- Bill Doggett – organ
- Clifford Scott – tenor saxophone, alto saxophone, flute (tracks 2–12)
- Percy France – tenor saxophone (track 1)
- Billy Butler (tracks 2–12), Jerry Lane (track 1) – guitar
- Edwyn Conley (tracks 2–12), Clarence Mack (track 1) – bass
- Shep Shepherd – drums
