= Doggett Beat for Dancing Feet =

Studio album by Bill Doggett
- Released: 1957
- Recorded: December 16, 1953, May 19, 1954, January 12 & December 21, 1956, February 12, May 9 & July 17, 1957
- Studio: Chicago, Illinois; New York City, New York; Cincinnati, Ohio
- Length: 31:38
- Label: King; King 557

Bill Doggett chronology
A Salute to Ellington (1957)	Doggett Beat for Dancing Feet (1957)	Candle Glow (1958)

Doggett Beat for Dancing Feet is an album by American organist Bill Doggett released by the King label in 1957.

== Critical reception ==
Professional ratings
Review scores
Source	Rating
AllMusic	3/5 stars

AllMusic reviewer Bill Dhal stated "Doggett's fatback organ cooks in tandem with Butler's licks and Scott's sax".

== Track listing ==
1. "Soft" (Tiny Bradshaw) – 2:33
2. "And the Angels Sing" (Ziggy Elman, Johnny Mercer) – 2:40
3. "Ding Dong" (Bill Doggett, Billy Butler, Clifford Scott) – 3:06
4. "Honey" (Seymour Simons, Haven Gillespie, Richard A. Whiting) – 2:31
5. "Easy" (Doggett, Danny Small) – 2:33
6. "Hammer Head" (Doggett, Scott, Shep Shepherd) – 2:58
7. "Ram-Bunk-Shush" (Jimmy Mundy, Lucky Millinder) – 2:36
8. "Chloe" (Niel Moret, Gus Kahn) 2:57
9. "Hot Ginger" (Doggett, Scott) – 2:47
10. "King Bee" (Doggett) — 2:42
11. "What a Diff'rence a Day Made" (María Grever, Stanley Adams) – 2:57
12. "Shindig" (Henry Glover) – 2:24

== Personnel ==
- Bill Doggett – organ
- Clifford Scott – tenor saxophone, alto saxophone, flute, French horn (tracks 1, 3, 6, 7, 9, 11 & 12)
- Percy France – tenor saxophone (tracks 2, 5, 10, & 11)
- Irving "Skinny" Brown – tenor saxophone (track 4)
- Clifford Bush (track 4), Billy Butler (tracks 1, 3, 6–9, 11 & 12), Jerry Lane (tracks 2, 5 & 10) – guitar
- Abie Baker (tracks 3, 6 & 9), Edwyn Conley (track 7), Al Lucas (track 11), Clarence Mack (tracks 2, 4, 5 & 10), Johnny Pate (tracks 1 & 12), Carl Pruitt (track 9) – bass
- Shep Shepherd – drums
- Thomas "Bean" Bowles (tracks 1 & 12), Leslie Johnakins (tracks 3, 6 & 9) – baritone saxophone
- Ray Barretto, Elwood Frazier – percussion (track 9)
