= Yesterday, Today & Tomorrow (Billy Butler album) =

Studio album by Billy Butler
- Released: 1970
- Recorded: April 27 and June 29, 1970
- Studio: Van Gelder Studio, Englewood Cliffs, New Jersey
- Genre: Jazz
- Length: 33:03
- Label: Prestige; PR 7797
- Producer: Bob Porter

Billy Butler chronology
| Guitar Soul! (1969) | Yesterday, Today & Tomorrow (1970) | Night Life (1971) |

Yesterday, Today & Tomorrow is the third album led by guitarist Billy Butler which was recorded in 1970 and released on the Prestige label.

== Reception ==
Professional ratings
Review scores
| Source | Rating |
|---|---|
| Allmusic | 4/5 stars |

Allmusic awarded the album 8 stars stating "Billy Butler was a guitarist's guitarist and an innovator in both production and arrangements. This disc is solid from top to bottom and reveals the restless spirit of a quiet yet decomposing artist".

== Track listing ==
All compositions by Billy Butler except where noted

1. "Yesterday, Today and Tomorrow" - 5:14
2. "Girl Talk" (Neal Hefti, Bobby Troup) - 4:57
3. "Dancing on the Ceiling" (Lorenz Hart, Richard Rodgers) - 5:45
4. "Hold It!" (Billy Butler, Clifford Scott) - 3:52
5. "Evening Dreams" - 4:11
6. "The Butler Did It" - 3:49
7. "Sweet Georgia Brown" (Ben Bernie, Kenneth Casey, Maceo Pinkard) - 4:48
- Recorded at Van Gelder Studio in Englewood Cliffs, New Jersey on April 27 (tracks 5 & 6), and June 29 (tracks 1–4 & 7), 1970

== Personnel ==
- Billy Butler - guitar, bass guitar
- Houston Person - tenor saxophone (tracks 1–4 & 7)
- Jerome Richardson - tenor saxophone, flute (tracks 5 & 6)
- Ernie Hayes (tracks 1–4 & 7), Sonny Phillips (tracks 5 & 6) - organ, electric piano
- Everett Barksdale, Billy Suyker - guitar (tracks 5 & 6)
- Jimmy Lewis (tracks 1–4 & 7), Chuck Rainey (tracks 5 & 6) - electric bass
- Jimmy Johnson - drums
