= Juanita Kidd Stout =

American judge

- Juanita Kidd Stout

Justice of the Supreme Court of Pennsylvania
- In office 1988–1989

Personal details
- Born: March 7, 1919 Wewoka, Oklahoma, U.S.
- Died: August 21, 1998 (aged 79) Philadelphia, Pennsylvania, U.S.
- Education: University of Iowa (BM); Indiana University (LLB, JD)

Juanita Kidd Stout (March 7, 1919 – August 21, 1998) was an American attorney and jurist who served as a justice of the Supreme Court of Pennsylvania from 1988 to 1989. She had previously operated a private legal practice in Philadelphia, Pennsylvania.

After working in the District Attorney's office, where Stout was known for her successful prosecutions, she was appointed on an interim basis to the municipal court bench in 1959, becoming the first African-American woman to serve as a judge in the state. Elected that year to the municipal court, she was the first African-American woman elected to any judgeship in the United States. When she was appointed to the state's supreme court, Stout was the first African-American woman to serve on the supreme court of any state.

== Early life and education ==
She was born as Juanita Kidd in Wewoka, Oklahoma on March 7, 1919. Her parents were both teachers, but were not paid well in the segregated state. She always "credited her mother with instilling a lifelong habit of hard work." As a child, Stout learned to read at age three, entered the third grade at age six, and started college at age 16. She graduated from Douglass High School in Wewoka.

She first attended Lincoln University, a historically black college in Jefferson City, Missouri, and later completed her bachelor's degree in music at the University of Iowa. She returned to Oklahoma to work as a music teacher. Stout was also a member of Delta Sigma Theta sorority.

During World War II, she joined other young women and went to Washington, D.C., to work. At a law firm, she discovered skills in taking legal dictation and started to study law. She earned two law degrees at Indiana University.

== Career ==
In 1950, she moved to Philadelphia, Pennsylvania, where she had been invited to work for William H. Hastie, who had been appointed to the United States Court of Appeals for the Third Circuit. She had worked for him in Washington, D.C. A few years later Stout established her own law practice in 1954. She was appointed to the District Attorney's office, where she became renowned for her record of successful prosecutions and her meticulous preparation.

In 1959 Stout was appointed as a municipal court judge, the first African-American woman in the state to serve as a judge. That year she won election to the post and was the first African-American woman in the United States to be elected to a judgeship. On November 15, 1959, Stout appeared on the game show What's My Line?.

She later was appointed to the Court of Common Pleas, where she specialized in homicide cases. In 1988 she was appointed to the Supreme Court of Pennsylvania, the first African-American woman in the United States to serve on the supreme court of any state. She served for one year before obligatory retirement at age 70.

== Personal life ==
Stout met her husband, Charles Otis Stout, while attending law school in Indiana. Stout’s husband died in 1988. Stout died in Philadelphia in 1998.

== Legacy and honors ==
- Stout was inducted into the Oklahoma Women's Hall of Fame in 1983.
- In 2012, a Philadelphia, Pennsylvania city courthouse was renamed as the Justice Juanita Kidd Stout Center for Criminal Justice in her honor.

== See also ==
- List of African-American jurists
- List of first women lawyers and judges in Pennsylvania
