= Dance Awhile with Doggett =

Studio album by Bill Doggett
- Released: 1958
- Recorded: December 16, 1953, August 23, 1955, October 7, 1957, February 26 and March 4, 1958
- Studio: Cincinnati, Ohio; Chicago, Illinois; New York City, New York
- Genre: Jazz
- Length: 31:05
- Label: King; King 585

Bill Doggett chronology
Swingin' Easy (1958)	Dance Awhile with Doggett (1958)	12 Songs of Christmas (1958)

Dance Awhile with Doggett is an album by American organist Bill Doggett released by the King label in 1958.

== Critical reception ==
Professional ratings
Review scores
Source	Rating
AllMusic	4.5/5 stars

AllMusic reviewer Myles Boisen stated "The emphasis on this release is on R&B-inflected combo jazz ranging from the soft (but not sappy) sound of Doggett's ethereal organ ... Of course, this wouldn't be a complete smorgasbord without a touch of the exotic ... As always, there's plenty of grits 'n' gravy saxophone, great guitar ... and even some real soulful flute playing".

== Track listing ==
All compositions by Bill Doggett except where noted

1. "Flying Home" (Benny Goodman, Lionel Hampton, Sid Robin) – 2:26
2. "Misty Moon" – 2:01
3. "Bone Tones" (Shep Shepherd) – 2:46
4. "Tailor Made" – 2:50
5. "Chelsea Bridge" (Billy Strayhorn) – 2:51
6. "The Kid from Franklin Street" (Billy Butler) – 2:34
7. "Pied Piper of Islip" – 2:36
8. "Passion Flower" (Strayhorn) – 2:29
9. "The Song Is Ended" (Irving Berlin) – 2:23
10. "Autumn Dreams" – 2:43
11. "How Could You?" (Tyree Glenn) – 2:25
12. "Smoochie" – 3:01
- Recorded in Cincinnati, OH on December 16, 1953 (tracks 4 & 9), August 23, 1955 (track 2), February 26, 1958 (tracks 6, 7 & 11) and March 4, 1958 (tracks 3, 5, 8 & 10) and in New York City, NY on October 7, 1957 (tracks 1 & 12)

== Personnel ==
- Bill Doggett – organ
- Lawrence "Tricky" Lofton – trombone (tracks 6, 7 & 11)
- Clifford Scott – tenor saxophone, alto saxophone, flute (tracks 1, 6, 7, 11 & 12)
- Percy France (tracks 2, 4 & 9), Floyd "Candy" Johnson (tracks 3, 5, 8 & 10) – tenor saxophone
- Thomas Bowles – baritone saxophone (tracks 1, 6, 7, 11 & 12)
- Billy Butler (tracks 1, 2, 6, 7, 11 & 12), Jerry Lane (tracks 4 & 9) – guitar
- Edwyn Conley (tracks 2, 6, 7 & 11), Clarence Mack (tracks 4 & 9), Carl Pruitt (tracks 1 & 12) – bass
- Shep Shepherd – drums (tracks 1, 2, 4, 6, 7, 9, 11 & 12)
