= Helen (album) =

Studio album by Helen Humes
- Released: 1981
- Recorded: Nola Studio, New York City, June 17–19, 1980
- Genre: jazz
- Length: 34:33
- Label: Muse Records
- Producer: Bob Porter, Shirley Selzer

Professional ratings
Review scores
Source	Rating
Allmusic	4.5/5 stars

Helen is an album released by Helen Humes in 1981 on Muse MR 5233, her second for that company. The album was in the final nominations for the 24th Annual Grammy Awards in the category of “Best Jazz Vocal Performance.”

== Personnel ==
- Helen Humes – vocals
- Joe Wilder – trumpet
- Buddy Tate – tenor sax
- Norman Simmons – piano
- Billy Butler – guitar
- George Duvivier – bass
- Butch Miles – drums

== Track listing ==
1. "There'll Be Some Changes Made" (B. Overstreet – B. Higgins) – 4:55
2. "Easy Living" (Ralph Rainger – Leo Robin) – 4:16
3. "You Brought a New Kind of Love to Me" (Sammy Fain – Irving Kahal – Pierre Norman) – 7:45
4. ""Evil Gal Blues"" (Leonard Feather) – 6:48
5. "Why Try to Change Me Now?" (C. Coleman – J. A. McCarthy) – 4:04
6. "Draggin’ My Heart Around" (A. Hill) – 6:45
