= Billy Butler (guitarist) =

American soul jazz guitarist (1924–1991)

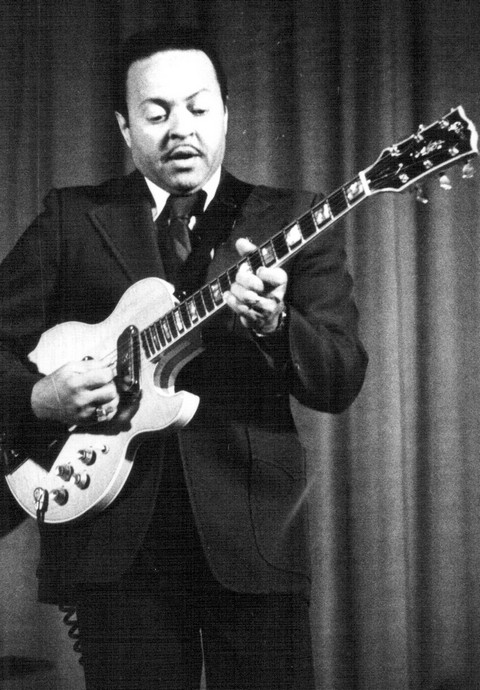
- Billy Butler in 1977

Background information
- Born: December 15, 1924; Philadelphia, Pennsylvania, U.S.
- Died: March 20, 1991 (aged 66) Teaneck, New Jersey
- Genres: Jazz
- Occupation: Musician
- Instrument: Guitar
- Formerly of: Bill Doggett

William Butler Jr. (December 15, 1924 – March 20, 1991) was an American soul jazz guitarist.

== Career ==
A native of Philadelphia, Butler began his career in the 1940s behind the Harlemaires. In the 1950s he was a member of a trio led by Doc Bagby and accompanied keyboardist Bill Doggett. He co-wrote "Honky Tonk", an R&B hit for Doggett.

Butler also worked with Al Casey, King Curtis, Eddie "Lockjaw" Davis, Bill Davison, Tommy Flanagan, Panama Francis, Dizzy Gillespie, Benny Goodman, Johnny Hodges, Floyd "Candy" Johnson, David "Fathead" Newman, Houston Person, Sammy Price, Jimmy Smith, Norris Turney, and Dinah Washington.

He is credited as the guitarist on Joey Dee and the Starliters' "Peppermint Twist, Parts 1 & 2" recorded in September 1961 at the Peppermint Lounge in New York City. Part 1 of the song went to the top of the Billboard pop charts in January 1962.

Butler died of a heart attack at home in Teaneck, New Jersey, in 1991.

== Discography ==
=== As leader ===
- This Is Billy Butler! (Prestige, 1969)
- Guitar Soul! (Prestige, 1969)
- Yesterday, Today & Tomorrow (Prestige, 1970)
- Night Life (Prestige, 1971)
- Billy Butler Plays Via Galactica (Kilmarnock, 1973)
- Guitar Odyssey with Al Casey, Jackie Williams (Jazz Odyssey, 1974)
- Don't Be That Way (Black & Blue, 1976)

=== As sideman ===
With Gene Ammons

- Brother Jug! (Prestige, 1969)
- My Way (Prestige, 1971)

With James Brown

- Out of Sight (Smash, 1964)
- Showtime (Smash, 1964)
- Cold Sweat (King, 1967)

With King Curtis

- Music for Dancing The Twist! (RCA Victor, 1961)
- Old Gold (Tru-Sound, 1961)
- It's Party Time with King Curtis (Tru-Sound, 1962)
- Doing the Dixie Twist (Tru-Sound, 1962)

With Bill Doggett

- Moon Dust (King 395–502, 1956)
- Hot Doggett (King 395–514, 1956)
- As You Desire Me (King 395–523, 1956)
- Everybody Dance the Honky Tonk (King 395–531, 1956)
- Dame Dreaming (King, 1957)
- A Salute to Ellington (King, 1957)
- Doggett Beat for Dancing Feet (King, 1957)
- Candle Glow (King 563, 1958)
- Swingin' Easy (King 582, 1958)
- Dance Awhile with Doggett (King 585, 1958)
- 12 Songs of Christmas (King 600, 1958)
- Hold It! (King 609, 1959)
- High and Wide (King 633, 1959)
- Big City Dance Party (King 641, 1959)
- Bill Doggett on Tour [not a live album] (King 667, 1959)
- For Reminiscent Lovers, Romantic Songs By Bill Doggett (King 706, 1960)
- Back With More Bill Doggett (King 723, 1960)
- The Many Moods of Bill Doggett (King 778, 1962)
- Bill Doggett Plays American Songs, Bossa Nova Style (King 830, 1963)
- Impressions (King 868, 1963)
- Wow! (ABC-Paramount, 1964)

With Dizzy Gillespie

- The Melody Lingers On (Limelight, 1966)
- It's My Way (Solid State, 1969)
- Cornucopia (Solid State, 1969)

With John P. Hammond

- Big City Blues (Vanguard, 1964)
- Mirrors (Vanguard, 1967)

With Johnny Hodges

- Blue Pyramid (Verve, 1966) - with Wild Bill Davis
- Triple Play (RCA Victor, 1967)

With Illinois Jacquet

- Spectrum (Argo, 1965)
- The King! (Prestige, 1968)

With Ben E. King

- What Is Soul (Atco, 1967)

With Freddie King

- Freddie King is a Blues Master (Atlantic, 1969)

With Memphis Slim

- Legend of the Blues Vol. 1 (Jubilee, 1967)
- The Legacy of the Blues Vol. 7 (Sonet, 1973)

With David "Fathead" Newman

- Bigger & Better (Atlantic, 1968)
- The Many Facets of David Newman (Atlantic, 1969)

With Houston Person

- Goodness! (Prestige, 1969)
- Truth! (Prestige, 1970)
- Houston Express (Prestige, 1970)

With Jimmy Smith

- Hoochie Coochie Man (Verve, 1966)
- Peter & the Wolf (Verve, 1966)
- Jimmy Smith Plays the Blues (Verve, 1988) - compilation

With Sonny Stitt

- Soul Electricity! (Prestige, 1968)
- Come Hither (Solid State, 1969)
- Goin' Down Slow (Prestige, 1972)
- Satan (Cadet, 1974)

With Grady Tate

- Windmills of My Mind (Skye, 1968)
- Movin' Day (Janus, 1975)

With others

- Dedicated to You, The "5" Royales (King, 1957)
- Back to the Blues, Dinah Washington (Roulette, 1963)
- Tough Talk!, Panama Francis Blues Band (20th Century Fox, 1963)
- Soul Outing!, Frank Foster (Prestige, 1966)
- Grits & Gravy, Eric Kloss (Prestige, 1966)
- Jazz for the Jet Set, Dave Pike (Atlantic, 1966)
- Oliver Nelson Plays Michelle, Oliver Nelson (Impulse!, 1966)
- Soul Drums, Bernard Purdie (Date, 1967)
- That Healin' Feelin', Richard "Groove" Holmes (Prestige, 1968)
- Workin' on a Groovy Thing, Barbara Lewis (Atlantic, 1968)
- I Wish I Knew, Solomon Burke (Atlantic, 1968)
- King Solomon, Solomon Burke (Atlantic, 1968)
- Street Man, Barry Goldberg (Buddah, 1969)
- The Source, Jimmy Scott (Atlantic, 1969)
- Black Is Brown and Brown Is Beautiful, Ruth Brown (Skye, 1969)
- Fat Albert Rotunda, Herbie Hancock (Warner/Reprise, 1969)
- Comment, Les McCann (Atlantic, 1970)
- Jungle Fire!, Pucho & His Latin Soul Brothers (Prestige, 1970)
- Something, Shirley Scott (Atlantic, 1970)
- Hard Mother Blues, Ernie Wilkins (Mainstream, 1970)
- Blues.. and Then Some, Percy Mayfield (RCA Victor, 1971)
- The Chuck Rainey Coalition, Chuck Rainey (Skye, 1972)
- Blacknuss, Rahsaan Roland Kirk (Atlantic, 1972)
- Mind's Eye, Jon Lucien (RCA, 1974)
- Is Having a Wonderful Time, Geoff Muldaur (Reprise, 1975)
- The Doctor is In... and Out, Yusef Lateef (Atlantic, 1976)
- Jaws Strikes Again, Eddie "Lockjaw" Davis (Black & Blue, 1976)
- Two of Us, Irene Reid (Glades, 1976)
- All Right OK You Win, Wild Bill Davis (Black & Blue, 1976) - with Eddie "Lockjaw" Davis
- Transformations, Bunky Green (Vanguard, 1977)
- When You're Down and Out, Carrie Smith (Black & Blue, 1977)
- Helen, Helen Humes (Muse, 1980)
- What's the Secret of Your Success, The Coasters (Mr. R&B, 1980) - compilation
- The Groover, Jimmy McGriff (JAM [Jazz America Marketing], 1982)
- The Glory of Alberta Hunter, Alberta Hunter (Columbia, 1982)
- Blues 'N' Jazz, B.B. King (MCA, 1983)
- Look for the Silver Lining, Alberta Hunter (Columbia, 1983)
- One More for the Road, Charles Brown (Alligator, 1986)
