= William Oscar Smith =

William Oscar (W.O.) Smith
- William Oscar (W.O. Smith)

Background information
- Born: May 2, 1917; Bartow, Georgia
- Died: May 31, 1991 (aged 74) Nashville, Tennessee
- Genres: Jazz, classical
- Instruments: Double bass, viola

William Oscar Smith (May 2, 1917 – May 31, 1991), was a jazz double bassist and music educator. Although he never pursued a solo career, and, as a result, is not often remembered by jazz historians, Smith was an important player in early jazz history as a sideman. Most notably, Smith was the bassist on Coleman Hawkins' iconic 1939 recording of "Body and Soul". The great jazz trumpeter Dizzy Gillespie said of Smith, "Of all the musicians I've had the pleasure of associating with, I can say that Oscar Smith was among the most gifted. His timing and resolution were almost perfect. He helped me discover my own sense of harmony and rhythm." Gillespie describes him as a sideman extraordinaire.

== Life and career ==
W.O. Smith was born in Bartow, Georgia, on May 2, 1917. When he was six months old, his family moved to Philadelphia, Pennsylvania, due to threats his father received from local white supremacists. Smith spent the remainder of his childhood in Philadelphia, graduating from Benjamin Franklin High School. He lived in the same neighbourhood as Dizzy Gillespie who moved to Philadelphia in 1935. Smith and Gillespie started out in music together, playing for the Frankie Fairfax Band until 1937, when Gillespie moved away.

After attending Mastbaum Vocational School of Music and graduating from Lincoln University in 1937, Smith made his way to New York City to enroll at New York University (NYU). During this period, Smith played with some of the greats of jazz history, including Bessie Smith, Fats Waller, Dizzy Gillespie and Coleman Hawkins. Smith became a part of jazz history as the bassist on Coleman Hawkins seminal 1939 recording of "Body and Soul". In June 1942, he received his Bachelor's Degree from NYU. Smith began graduate studies at the University of Texas at Austin and ultimately earned his Ph.D. from the University of Iowa.

During World War II Smith acted as the band director in the Thirty-Seventh Special Services Company, U.S. Army, stationed in Fort Huachucha, Arizona. Following his military service, he briefly returned to New York, working as a musician. During this period, Smith began his lifelong career as an educator, teaching at Seward Park High School in New York.

In 1945, Smith moved to Baltimore, where he met and married Catherine Leeds in 1948. The couple had three children together: Jacqueline, Jay and Joel.

In 1952, the family settled in Nashville, Tennessee, where Smith began his career on the faculty of the Tennessee State University. In 1962, Smith became the second black member in the history of the Nashville Symphony Orchestra, with which he played double bass and viola for seventeen years. Smith also worked as an adjunct professor at the Blair School of Music at Vanderbilt University.

In 1984 smith opened the W.O. Smith Music School in Nashville with the aim of offering musical instruction to low-income families. On inception, the school served 45 students, it has since developed into a state-of-the-art facility with over 650 students. In his memoir, Smith remembered his life as that of "a witness, an anonymous witness. A sideman along for the ride. A witness to the birth and growth of jazz as an American art form. A witness to the unfolding drama of the civil rights movement." As he put it, "It has been long and interesting gig for me."

== Death ==
After a lengthy struggle with cancer, W.O. Smith died on May 31, 1991, in Nashville. Shortly before his death, Smith completed his memoir, Sideman: The Long Gig of W.O. Smith, a Memoir which was published posthumously in 1991. He is buried at Woodlawn Memorial Park in Nashville.
