= Justice Juanita Kidd Stout Center for Criminal Justice =

Coordinates: 39.953709°N 75.161622°W

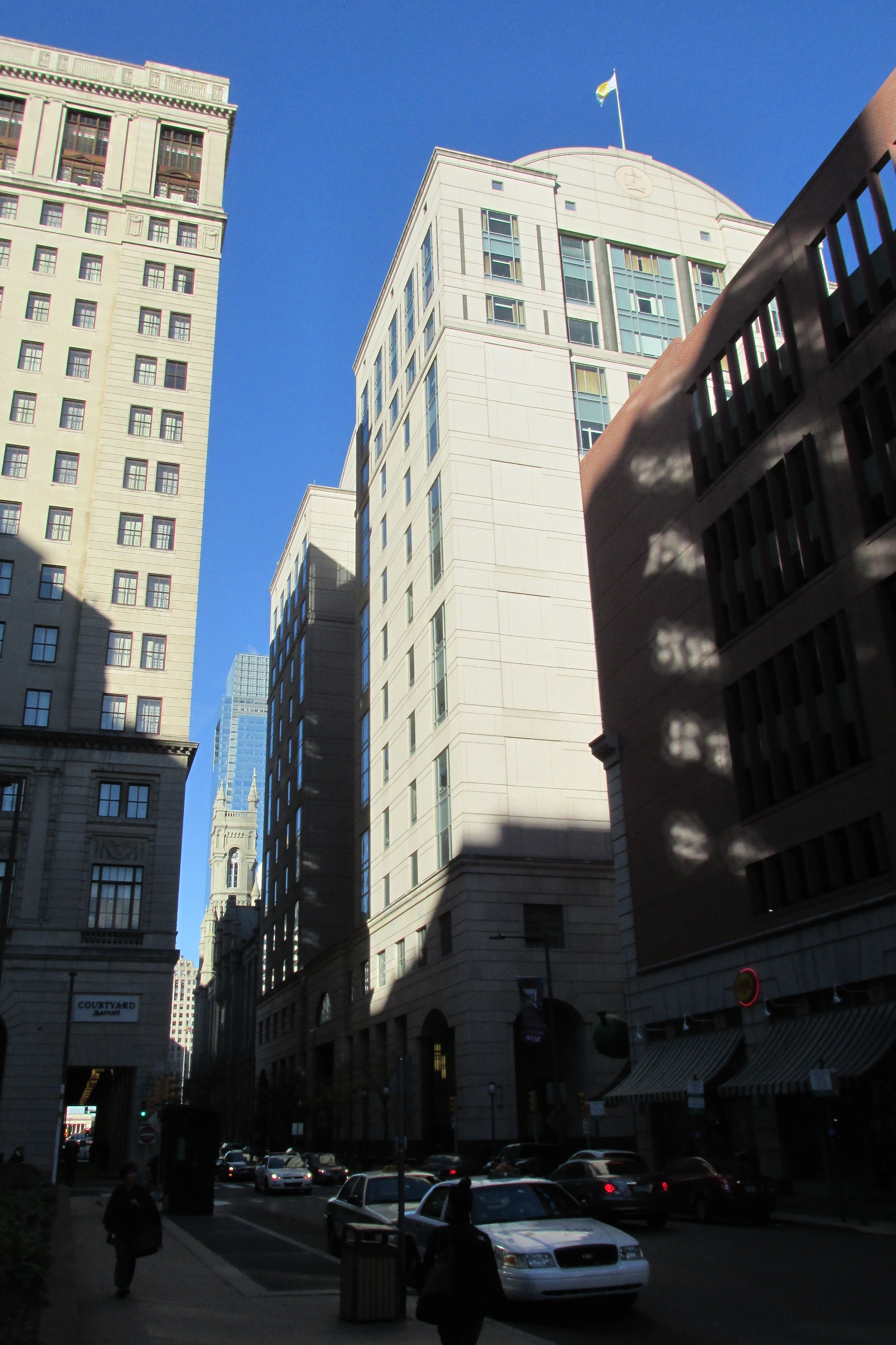
Justice Juanita Kidd Stout Center for Criminal Justice

The Justice Juanita Kidd Stout Center for Criminal Justice (formerly the Criminal Justice Center or CJC), is a courthouse that is located in Philadelphia, Pennsylvania. It is the main criminal courthouse of the First Judicial District of Pennsylvania (which comprises Philadelphia), housing the Criminal Section of the Philadelphia Court of Common Pleas and the Criminal Division of the Philadelphia Municipal Court.

== History and architectural features ==
The CJC is a seventeen-story, steel-framed building that was completed in 1994 in order to alleviate pressure from courtrooms located in Philadelphia City Hall. The center is located at 1301 Filbert Street.

In May 2012, the Criminal Justice Center was renamed in honor of the late Justice Juanita Kidd Stout.

== See also ==
- Philadelphia City Hall (the main civil courthouse of the First Judicial District)
- List of state and county courthouses in Pennsylvania
