= This Is Billy Butler! =

Studio album by Billy Butler
- Released: 1969
- Recorded: December 16, 1968
- Studio: Van Gelder Studio, Englewood Cliffs, New Jersey
- Genre: Jazz
- Length: 33:03
- Label: Prestige
- Producer: Bob Porter

Billy Butler chronology
| This Is Billy Butler! (1969) | Guitar Soul! (1969) |

This Is Billy Butler! is the debut album by guitarist Billy Butler which was recorded in 1968 and released by Prestige Records.

== Reception ==
Professional ratings
Review scores
| Source | Rating |
|---|---|
| Allmusic | 4/5 stars |

Allmusic awarded the album 4 stars stating "It took the Philadelphian 43 years to record as a leader, and this excellent LP proved that he was certainly up to the task".

== Track listing ==
| No. | Title | Length |
|---|---|---|
| 1. | "The Twang Thang" (Billy Butler/Ernie Hayes) | 5:15 |
| 2. | "Cherry" (Don Redman) | 6:42 |
| 3. | "Work Song" (Nat Adderley) | 5:51 |
| 4. | "The Soul Roll" (Butler) | 4:42 |
| 5. | "She Is My Inspiration" (Connie Wharton/Edward Wharton) | 5:11 |
| 6. | "Bass-ic Blues" (Butler) | 5:22 |

== Personnel ==
- Billy Butler – guitar, bass guitar
- Houston Person – tenor saxophone
- Ernie Hayes – piano, organ
- Bob Bushnell – bass guitar
- Rudy Collins – drums
