= Philadelphia Clef Club of Jazz and Performing Arts =

US cultural and educational organization

Coordinates: 39.941989°N 75.166263°W

Philadelphia Clef Club of Jazz & Performing Arts
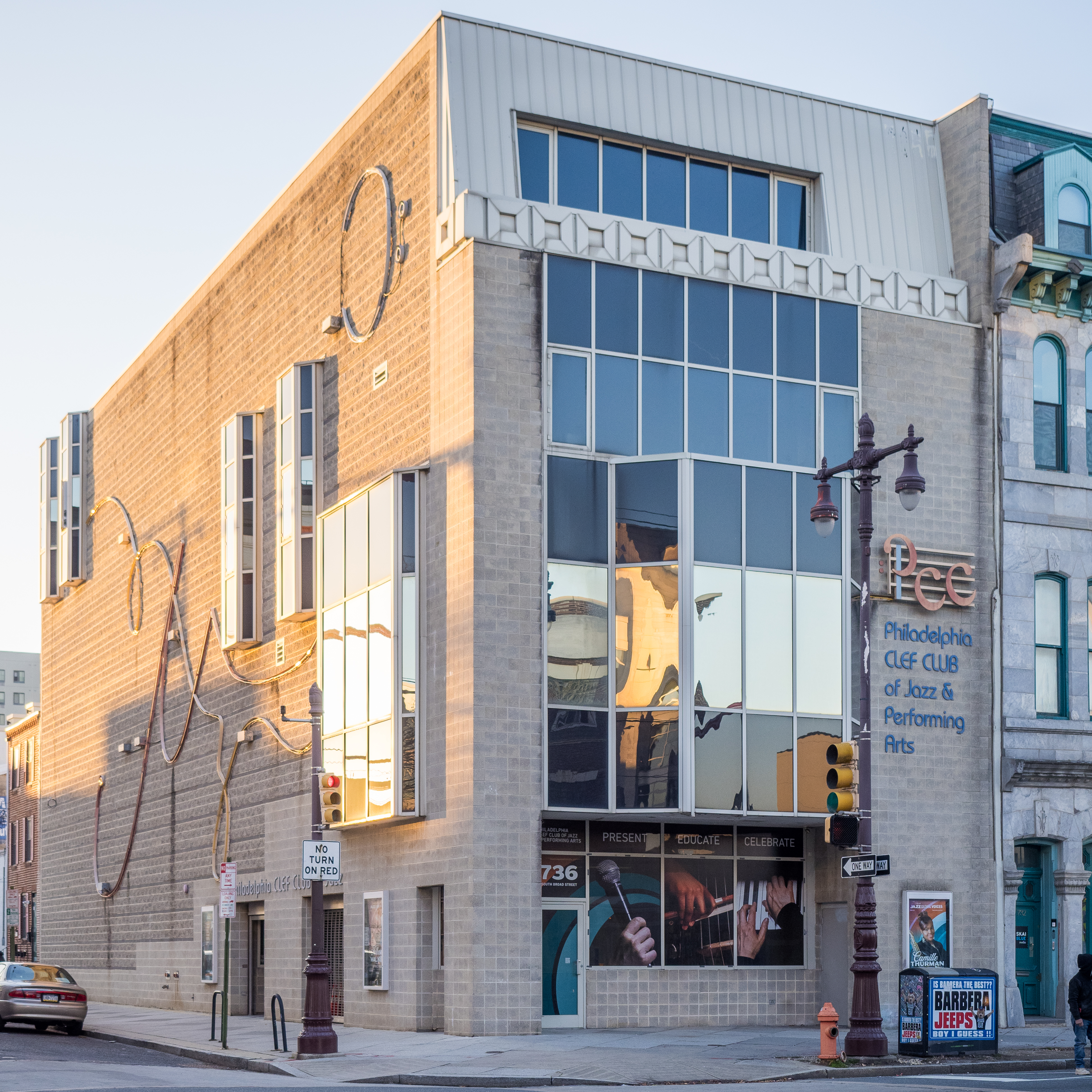
- Philadelphia Clef Club of Jazz and Performing Arts, February 2024
- Formation: 1966
- Headquarters: 736 South Broad Street Philadelphia, PA 19146-2232
- Website: https://clefclubofjazz.org

The Philadelphia Clef Club of Jazz and Performing Arts (PCC) is a tax-exempt, non-profit educational and cultural organization. The Clef Club offers jazz and musical performances, musical education, and outreach programs to the city of Philadelphia.

== History ==
The Philadelphia Clef Club of Jazz and Performing Arts was founded in 1966 by members of the Musicians' Protective Union Local 274, American Federation of Musicians (AFM). Local 274 was chartered in 1935 as a separate black local, due to black musicians being denied membership from the racially segregated Local 77. Local 274 enjoyed its autonomy for more than 36 years. It was the longest surviving independent Black Musicians' Union in the United States, of the more than fifty chartered in major cities.

After the passing of the Civil Rights Act of 1964, the NAACP and AFM started to pressure locals to de-segregate. Witnessing the merger of Chicago's predominantly-black Local 208 into Local 10 and the loss of its assets, Local 274 President Jimmy Adams established the Philadelphia Clef Club in 1966 as the social wing of Local 247. The social wing was created to preserve community. Adams transferred all of Local 274's assets to the Clef Club for $1, and in 1971 the AFM voided Local 274's charter because of its unwillingness to integrate back into Local 77. Local 274 had refused to become what was described as “submerged”.

Local 274 and the Philadelphia Clef Club's social unit are integral parts of the history of jazz in Philadelphia. They evolved out of black musicians' fight for political, economic, and cultural recognition during a long period of segregation and discrimination. Local 274's membership rolls included jazz greats, such as John Coltrane, Dizzy Gillespie, Shirley Scott, Lee Morgan, "Philly" Joe Jones, Grover Washington Jr., the Heath Brothers, and Nina Simone.

The word "Jazz" was added to the name of the Philadelphia Clef Club in 1994. The Philadelphia Clef Club of Jazz & Performing Arts, Inc. opened its new facility in October 1995. The facility was the first ever of its kind designed and constructed specifically to be a jazz institution. The concept of a jazz institution was a new one. Jazz had been present in the commercial sector; in bars, clubs, concert halls, and by the recording industry. The Philadelphia Clef Club is Philadelphia's only major music institution solely devoted to jazz. The Philadelphia Clef Club's vision is to have the community at large embrace and support jazz as a great American art form, understand its roots in the African American culture, and recognize jazz as central to African American heritage, viewing it as worthy of public and Institutional support.

== Programs and Operations ==
In 2024, the Philadelphia Clef Club's mission was stated to be to "celebrate and preserve the legacy of jazz through accessible education for the Greater Philadelphia region, and to support the evolving art form through talent development, programming, and public performance". The club has said that it wishes to accomplish this goal through supporting the development of talent and providing opportunities for the growth of performing artists, with an emphasis on instrumentalists. Additionally, it seeks to serve the artists and community by providing a space for the appreciation of jazz and related disciplines. It also hopes to promote music education, specifically in jazz.

Philadelphia Clef Club programs include: The Philadelphia Clef Club Youth Ensemble, Jazz Master Workshops, Youth Summer Jazz Camps, Student Ensemble Education Programs, Music Workshops in-school programs, Jazz Cultural Voices, and The Preservation Jazz Series concert series. Additional plans are: the implementation of senior citizen outreach programs consisting of instrumental instruction (individual and group) and vocal activities (individual and group); and associating with other community groups including other jazz organizations, churches, schools, and community centers in the Greater Philadelphia/Delaware Valley area.

In 2024, the organization announced a $4.5M renovation of their facility on Philadelphia's Broad Street, with the second phase being announced in July 2025. In 2026, the club will celebrate their 60th anniversary.
