= My Blue Heaven (song) =

1927 hit by Gene Austin

- Sheet music cover featuring Harry Richman, 1927

Song by Gene Austin
- B-side: "Are You Thinking Of Me To-night?"
- Published: October 10, 1927 by Leo Feist Inc.
- Released: November 4, 1927
- Recorded: September 14, 1927
- Studio: Victor Studios, New York City
- Genre: Jazz, Pop Vocal
- Label: Victor 20964
- Composer: Walter Donaldson
- Lyricist: George A. Whiting

Gene Austin singles chronology
"Ain't She Sweet" (1927)	"My Blue Heaven" (1927)	"My Melancholy Baby" (1928)

"My Blue Heaven" is a popular song written by Walter Donaldson with lyrics by George A. Whiting. The song was used in the Ziegfeld Follies of 1927. It has become part of various fake book collections. Its musical composition entered the public domain on January 1, 2023.

In 1928, "My Blue Heaven" became a huge hit on Victor 20964-A for crooner Gene Austin, accompanied by the Victor Orchestra as directed by Nat Shilkret. It sold over five million copies worldwide. Victor 20964-A was recorded on September 14, 1927 and was inducted into the Grammy Hall of Fame in 1978. The recording was reissued as Victor 24573 and has been reissued on several commercially available CDs.

== Background ==
"My Blue Heaven"
Gene Austin's hit recording

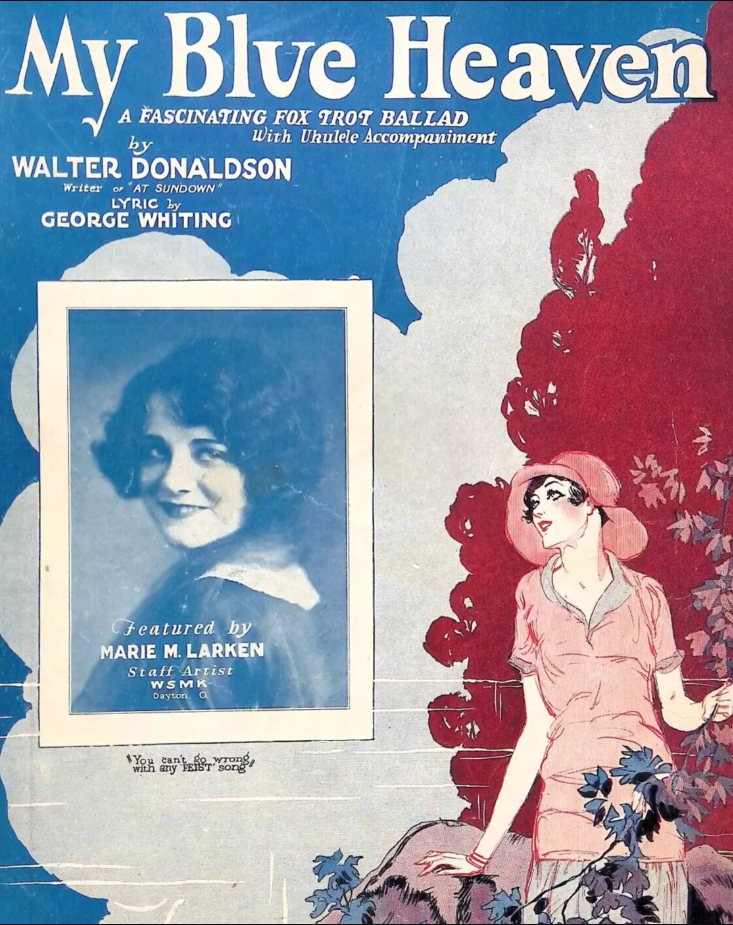
Alternate sheet music cover, 1927

The music for "My Blue Heaven" was written in 1924: "Donaldson wrote it one afternoon at the Friars Club in New York while waiting for his turn at the billiard table." The song was written while Donaldson was under contract to Irving Berlin, working for Berlin's publishing company, Irving Berlin Inc. George A. Whiting wrote lyrics adapted for Donaldson's music, and for a while, performed it in his vaudeville act with Sadie Burt, incorporating it in their show Songsayings, but no recording was ever made of Whiting and Burt performing the song; three years later, Tommy Lyman started singing it on the radio as his theme song.

Austin, unhappy with the Victor Company and "convinced that the best material which he brought to the company’s attention was going to other artists", "gave Nat Shilkret an ultimatum that he wouldn’t do another session unless his interpretation [of "My Blue Heaven"] was commercially released. According to Austin, an agreement was reached for "My Blue Heaven" to be coupled with "Are You Thinking of Me Tonight?", the most highly regarded song among those he was planning to record at that time." On the day "My Blue Heaven" was to be recorded, after takes of the other songs had been completed, to Austin's surprise the musicians packed up and left the studio; Shilkret told Austin they had a conflict, but in a scene documented by H. Allen Smith in his A Short History of Fingers, Austin "grabbed an old guy with a cello and talked him into standing by. Then [he] grabbed a song plugger who could play pretty fair piano. And the third fellow [he] got was an agent who could whistle – bird calls and that sort of thing." Austin recorded "My Blue Heaven" with that hastily assembled trio.

== Copyright ==
Donaldson established his own publishing company in 1928, and his rights in the song were apparently assigned to his company at that time, with the song listed as having been published by George Whiting Music and Donaldson Music.

The song was subject to copyright in 1925 and 1927. These copyrights were renewed in 1953 and 1955, after the death of both composers, at which time the rights in the song were owned by Leo Feist, Inc. The rights were thereafter assigned to the EMI Catalogue Partnership, controlled and administered by EMI Feist Catalog Inc.

== Film appearances ==
- 1931: The Neighbor's Wife and Mine
- 1932: The Last Mile
- 1936: Swing Banditry - Music by Walter Donaldson; Lyrics by George Whiting; Performed by Georgie Stoll and His Orchestra, sung by Virginia Dale
- 1941: Penny Serenade – played on a record and as background music.
- 1943: Never a Dull Moment – sung by Frances Langford
- 1948: Tom & Jerry: Kitty Foiled - whistled by Cuckoo the Canary and Jerry at the short's end
- 1950: My Blue Heaven – sung during the opening credits by Betty Grable, Dan Dailey and chorus. Danced by Grable and Dailey.
- 1955: Love Me or Leave Me – sung by Doris Day.
- 1959: The Five Pennies – played by Bob Crosby and the band in rehearsal.
- 1967: Titicut Follies – trombone rendition by one of the inmates
- 1972: The Ruling Class – sung by Peter O'Toole and Carolyn Seymour
- 1990: My Blue Heaven – performed by Fats Domino
- 1991: Fried Green Tomatoes – performed by Gene Austin and his orchestra
- 1995: Antonia's Line

Loretta Swit also performed a version of the song in the "Dear Dad, Again" episode of the television series M*A*S*H which first aired in February 1973.

== CD reissues of Gene Austin recording ==
The 1928 Victor recording (20964-A) by Gene Austin, accompanied by Nat Shilkret and the Victor Orchestra, has had several late-20th-century and early-21st-century reissues on compact disc:

- Billboard Pop Memories – The 1920s, compilation, Rhino R2-71575, 1994
- Chart-Toppers of The Twenties, compilation, ASV/Living Era AJA-5292, 1998
- Gene Austin: Singer and Songwriter, Gene Austin, Collectors' Choice CCM-10402, 2002
- Nipper's Greatest Hits – The 20's, compilation, BMG-RCA 2258-2-R, 1990
- They Sold a Million, compilation, Pulse PBX CD 430, 1999
- The Voice of the Southland, Gene Austin, ASV/Living Era AJA-5217, 1996
- Yes, Sir, That's My Baby: The Golden Years of Tin Pan Alley 1920–1929, compilation, New World 80279-2, 2002

== Other chart versions ==
Other notable versions were also recorded by Paul Whiteman (recorded July 6, 1927 with a vocal group including Bing Crosby), Nick Lucas (1928), Don Voorhees (1928), and Seger Ellis (1928). The 1956 Fats Domino version was a two-sided hit with "I'm in Love Again", and reached number nineteen on the Billboard Top 100 chart and number five on the R&B Best Sellers chart.
