= I'm in Love Again (song) =

Single by Fats Domino
- A-side: "My Blue Heaven" (double A-side)
- Released: March 1956
- Genre: Rhythm and blues
- Length: 2:00
- Label: Imperial
- Songwriter(s): Dave Bartholomew; Fats Domino
- Producer(s): Dave Bartholomew

Fats Domino singles chronology
"Bo Weevil" (1956)	"I'm in Love Again" / "My Blue Heaven" (1956)	"When My Dreamboat Comes Home" (1956)

"I'm in Love Again" is a 1956 single by Fats Domino. The song was written by Domino and his longtime collaborator, Dave Bartholomew. The single was Domino's fifth number one on the R&B Best Sellers list, where it stayed at the top for seven weeks. "I'm in Love Again" also peaked at number three for two weeks on the pop chart. "I'm in Love Again" was a double-sided hit for Domino as the B-side of the pop standard, "My Blue Heaven".
