= Helen Humes =

American singer (1913–1981)

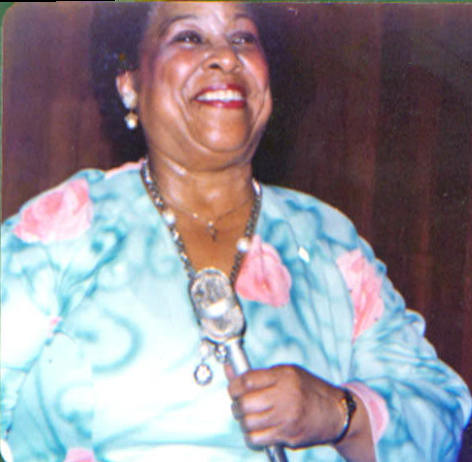
- Humes at the Village Jazz Lounge in Walt Disney World

Background information
- Born: June 23, 1913; Louisville, Kentucky, U.S.
- Died: September 13, 1981 (aged 68) Santa Monica, California, U.S.
- Genres: Blues; jazz; R&B
- Occupation: Singer
- Instrument: Vocals

Helen Humes (June 23, 1913 – September 13, 1981) was an American singer. She was a blues, R&B and classic popular singer.

== Early life ==
Humes was born on June 23, 1913, in Louisville, Kentucky, to Emma Johnson and John Henry Humes. She grew up as an only child. Her father was one of the first Black attorneys in her hometown, and her mother was a schoolteacher. In an interview, Humes recalled her parents singing to each other around the house and in a church choir.

Humes was introduced to music in the church, singing in the choir and getting piano and organ lessons given at Sunday school by Bessie Allen, who taught music to any child who wanted to learn. Humes began occasionally playing the piano in a small and locally traveling dance band, the Dandies. This constant involvement in music would lead to her singing career in the mid-1920s.

Humes attended Central High School in Louisville.

== Career ==
=== Early career ===
Humes' career began with her first vocal performance at an amateur contest in 1926, singing "When You're a Long, Long Way from Home" and "I'm in Love with You, That's Why". Her talents were noticed by a guitarist in the band, Sylvester Weaver, who recorded for Okeh Records and recommended her to the talent scout and producer Tommy Rockwell. At the age of 14, Humes recorded in St. Louis in April 1927, singing four blues songs, though only two of the sides were ever issued. A second recording session was held in New York, and this time she was accompanied by pianist J. C. Johnson.

Despite this introduction to the music world, Humes did not make another record for another ten years, during which she completed her high school degree, took finance courses, and worked at a bank, as a waitress, and as a secretary for her father. She stayed home for a while, eventually leaving to visit friends in Buffalo, New York. While there, she was invited to sing a few songs at the Spider Web, a cabaret in town. This brief performance turned into an audition, which turned into a $35-a-week job. She stayed in Buffalo, singing with a small group led by Al Sears.

=== Cincinnati Cotton Club ===
While Humes was home in Louisville (she said she always returned home at least twice a year) she received a call from Sears, who was in Cincinnati. He wanted her to sing at Cincinnati's Cotton Club. The Cotton Club was an important venue in the Cincinnati music scene. It was an integrated club which booked and promoted many black performers. Humes moved to Cincinnati in 1936 and sang with Sears's band again at the Cotton Club.

Count Basie first heard and approached Humes while she was performing at the Cotton Club in 1937. He asked her to join his touring band to replace Billie Holiday. He told her that she would be paid $35 a week, and she responded, "Oh shucks, I make that here and don't have to go no place!" Not long after this encounter, Humes moved in 1937 to New York City, where John Hammond, a talent scout and producer, heard her singing with Sears's band at the Renaissance Club. Through Hammond, she became a recording vocalist with Harry James's big band. Her swing recordings with James included "Jubilee", "I Can Dream, Can't I?", Jimmy Dorsey's composition "It's the Dreamer in Me", and "Song of the Wanderer". In March 1938, Hammond persuaded Humes to join Count Basie's Orchestra, where she stayed for four years.

=== The Count Basie Orchestra ===
In the Count Basie Orchestra, Humes sang ballads and popular songs. While she was also a talented blues singer, Jimmy Rushing, another member of the orchestra at the time, held domain over the blues vocals. Her vocals with Basie's band included "Between the Devil and the Deep Blue Sea" and "Moonlight Serenade".

On December 24, 1939, Humes performed with the Count Basie Orchestra, and James P. Johnson, at the second From Spirituals to Swing concert at Carnegie Hall, produced by John Hammond. After this concert, most of her time with the Basie Orchestra was spent touring. In a 1973 oral history, she described life on tour:

I used to pretend I was asleep on the Basie bus, so the boys wouldn't think I was hearing their rough talk. I'd sew buttons on and cook for them, too…in places where it was difficult to get anything to eat…down south. I wasn't interested in drinking and keeping late hours…but my kidneys couldn't stand the punishment of those long rides… then too I got tired of singing the same songs.

For these reasons, Humes left in 1942.

=== Café Society and solo career ===
While home again in Louisville in 1942, Humes was called by John Hammond and invited to sing at Café Society in New York. She performed frequently there, accompanied by the pianists Teddy Wilson and Art Tatum. During that year, she also performed at the Three Deuces, at the Famous Door with Benny Carter (February), at the Village Vanguard with Eddie Heywood, and on tour with a big band led by the trombonist Ernie Fields.

In 1944, Humes moved to Los Angeles, California, where she recorded and contributed to movie soundtracks. Some of the soundtracks she recorded were Panic in the Streets and My Blue Heaven. She appeared in the musical film Jivin' in Be-Bop, by Dizzy Gillespie. She also performed and toured with Jazz at the Philharmonic for five seasons. She recorded her most popular songs, two jump blues tunes, "Be-Baba-Leba" R&B #3 (Philo, 1945) and "Million Dollar Secret" R&B #6 (Modern, 1950). There was some controversy surrounding the single Be-Baba-Leba" because it had been recorded first by singer Tina Dixon who held the initial copyright. Dixon's version was released after Humes who popularized the tune. Despite her chart success, her career stagnated. From the late 1940s to the mid-1950s she made a few recordings, working with different bands and vocalists, including Nat King Cole, but was not nearly as active as she had been. In 1950, she recorded Benny Carter's "Rock Me to Sleep". She bridged the gap between big-band swing jazz and rhythm and blues.

In 1956, Humes toured Australia with the vibraphonist Red Norvo. Their tour was well received, and she returned again in 1962 and 1964. She performed at the Newport Jazz Festival in 1959 and the Monterey Jazz Festival in 1960 and 1962. She toured Europe with the first American Folk Blues Festival in 1962.

She returned to the United States in 1967 to take care of her ailing mother. At this point Humes viewed her singing career as a part of her past. She took a job at a local ammunition plant, sold her record player and her records and stopped singing. From 1967 to 1973, she did not work as a singer, until Stanley Dance persuaded her to perform at the Newport Jazz Festival in 1973. This performance led to a revival of her career in music. The festival was followed with multiple European engagements and some albums made in France for Black and Blue. She sang regularly at the Cookery in New York City from 1974 to 1977.

Humes subsequently performed occasionally in America and at European venues and festivals, including the prestigious Nice Jazz Festival in the mid-1970s. She recorded her final album, Helen, for Muse Records in 1980. She received the Music Industry of France Award in 1973 and the key to the city of Louisville in 1975.

Humes said of her career, "I'm not trying to be a star! I want to work and be happy and just go along and have my friends – and that's my career."

== Death ==
Humes died of cancer in Santa Monica, California, on September 13, 1981, at the age of 68. Her family requested donations for cancer research instead of flowers at her funeral. She is buried at the Inglewood Park Cemetery, in Inglewood, California.

== Style and reviews ==
Humes's vocal range was from G3 to C5, as she stated in a letter to the arranger Buck Clayton in preparation for a European tour, along with a list of her preferred songs. According to many critics, her voice was versatile, suiting pop songs and ballads as well as blues. She was compared to Ethel Waters and Mildred Bailey from early in her career and was often recorded singing the blues after her association with Basie. In an interview with the jazz critic Whitney Balliett, Humes explained, "I've been called a blues singer, a jazz singer, and a ballad singer – well, I'm all three, which means I'm just a singer." A review from Downbeat Magazine of her albums Talk of the Town, Helen Comes Back, and Helen Humes with Red Norvo and His Orchestra said the following about her collaboration with Red Norvo:

Norvo's sparkling vibes are the ideal complement to Helen's lithe, light timbered clarity…Helen is in particularly fine voice…[with] an uncanny resemblance to early Ella [Fitzgerald] in her sound and phrasing.

The review of Helen Comes Back was not as positive but did not fault the singer:

Blues dominates [the album]…[and] although her voice is delightful, the material is too simple to challenge her…Helen is a great deal more than a blues shouter.

Reviews in The Washington Post of her last performances, in Maryland in 1978 and Washington, D.C., in 1980, described her as "beaming and genial at 65" (in 1978) and gave insight into her versatile vocals: "her characteristically light voice [turning] rough as she belted out…'You Can Take My Man But You Can't Keep Him Long'." The reviews also described her use of back phrasing, reminiscent of Billie Holiday's signature style of phrasing a melody in an intimate, personal fashion.

== Discography ==
- Helen Humes (Contemporary, 1959 [1960])
- Songs I Like to Sing! (Contemporary, 1960 [1961])
- Swingin' with Humes (Contemporary, 1961)
- Helen Comes Back (Black & Blue, 1973)
- Sneakin' Around (Black & Blue, 1974; Classic Jazz, 1978)
- The Incomparable Helen Humes with Connie Berry & Her Jazz Hounds (Jazzology, 1974)
- Helen Humes with Connie Berry Trio (Audiophile, 1974 [1980])
- Midsummer Night's Songs with Red Norvo (RCA Victor, 1974)
- On the Sunny Side of the Street (Black Lion, 1975)
- The Talk of the Town (Columbia, 1975)
- 'Deed I Do [live] (Contemporary, 1976 [1994])
- Nice Jazz 1978 [live] (Black & Blue, 1978)
- Helen Humes and the Muse All Stars [live] (Muse, 1978 [1980])
- Let the Good Times Roll (Classic Jazz, 1980) reissue of Helen Comes Back
- Helen (Muse, 1980 [1981])
- Be-Baba-Leba (1944–52) (Whiskey, Women, And..., 1983)
- E-Baba-Le-Ba: The Rhythm and Blues Years (Savoy Jazz, 1986)
- New Million Dollar Secret (Whiskey, Women, And..., 1987)
- Complete 1927–1950 Studio Recordings (Jazz Factory, 2001) 3-CD
- The Helen Humes Collection 1927–62 (Acrobat, 2017) 2-CD
- Today I Sing the Blues 1944–1955 (Jasmine, 2018)

With the Count Basie Orchestra

- The Original American Decca Recordings (Decca/GRP, 1992)

With Harry James

- The Chronological Harry James and His Orchestra 1937–1939 (Classics, 1996)

With Don Byas

- Midnight at Minton's (Onyx, 1973; CD reissue: HighNote)

== Awards and honors ==
- Hot Club of France Award for Best Album of 1973
- Key to the City of Louisville, 1975, 1977
