= Honky Tonk (instrumental) =

"Honky Tonk (Part 1)"

Single by Bill Doggett

from the album Honky Tonk
- B-side: "Honky Tonk (Part 2)"
- Released: 1956
- Recorded: 1956
- Genre: R&B, Jazz, Blues
- Length: 3:05 (Part 1); 2:32 (Part 2)
- Label: King
- Songwriters: Bill Doggett; Shep Shepherd; Clifford Scott; Billy Butler

Bill Doggett singles chronology
| "What a Diff'rence a Day Made" (1956) | "Honky Tonk (Part 1)" (1956) | "Bubbins Rock" (1956) |

"Honky Tonk" is an instrumental written by Billy Butler, Bill Doggett, Clifford Scott, and Shep Shepherd. Doggett recorded it as a two-part single in 1956. It became Doggett's signature piece and a standard recorded by many other performers.

The instrumental peaked at number two for three weeks on the Billboard Hot 100, and was the biggest R&B hit of the year, spending thirteen non-consecutive weeks at the top of the charts. It was included in Robert Christgau's "Basic Record Library" of 1950s and 1960s recordings, published in Christgau's Record Guide: Rock Albums of the Seventies (1981).

== James Brown version ==
In 1972, James Brown recorded "Honky Tonk" with his band The J.B.'s, who were credited as "The James Brown Soul Train". The song was released as a two-part single which reached number seven on the R&B chart and number 44 on the pop chart.
