= Bill Doggett =

American swing and R&B pianist and organist (1916–1996)

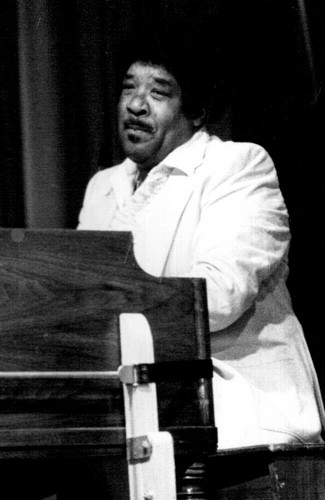
- Doggett in 1980

Background information
- Born: William Ballard Doggett; February 16, 1916; Philadelphia, Pennsylvania, U.S.
- Died: November 13, 1996 (aged 80) New York City, U.S.
- Genres: Blues; swing; jazz; R&B; rock and roll
- Occupation: Musician
- Instruments: Piano; organ
- Years active: 1930s–1996
- Label: King

William Ballard Doggett (February 16, 1916 – November 13, 1996) was an American pianist and organist. He began his career playing swing music before transitioning into rhythm and blues. Best known for his instrumental compositions "Honky Tonk" and "Hippy Dippy", Doggett was a pioneer of rock and roll. He worked with the Ink Spots, Johnny Otis, Wynonie Harris, Ella Fitzgerald, and Louis Jordan.

== Biography ==
Doggett was born in Philadelphia. During the 1930s and early 1940s he worked for Lucky Millinder, Frank Fairfax and arranger Jimmy Mundy. In 1942 he was hired as the Ink Spots' pianist and arranger.

In 1951, Doggett organized his own trio and began recording for King Records. His best known recording is "Honky Tonk", a rhythm and blues hit of 1956, which sold four million copies (reaching No. 1 R&B and No. 2 Pop), and which he co-wrote with Billy Butler. The track topped the US Billboard R&B chart for over two months. He also arranged for many bandleaders and performers, including Louis Armstrong, Count Basie, Ella Fitzgerald, and Lionel Hampton.

He continued to play and arrange until he died, aged 80, from cancer in New York City.

== Discography ==
=== Singles ===
Year	Titles (A-side, B-side) Both sides from same album except where indicated	Chart positions		Album
Year	Titles (A-side, B-side) Both sides from same album except where indicated	US	US R&B	Album
1945	"Be-Baba-Leba" b/w "Every Now and Then"; Both sides feature vocalist Helen Humes		3	Non-album tracks
1945	"He May Be Your Man" b/w "Blue Prelude"; Both sides feature vocalist Helen Humes			Non-album tracks
1953	"Moondust" /		18	Moon Dust
1953	"Early Bird"		21	Hot Doggett
1953	"No More In Life" (Vocals by Mildred Anderson) b/w "Real Gone Mambo" (from The Many Moods Of Bill Doggett)		20	Non-album track
1953	"Eventide" b/w "And The Angels Sing" (from The Doggett Beat For Happy Feet)			Moon Dust
1953	"The Christmas Song" b/w "Winter Wonderland"			All Time Christmas Favorites (later on 12 Songs Of Christmas)
1954	"It's A Dream" b/w "The Song Is Ended (But The Melody Lingers On)" (from Dance Awhile With Doggett)			Moon Dust
1954	"There's No You" b/w "Easy" (from The Doggett Beat For Happy Feet)			Moon Dust
1954	"Sweet Lorraine" b/w "Tailor Made" (from Dance Awhile With Doggett)			Dame Dreaming
1954	"High Heels" b/w "Sweet Slumber" (from Moon Dust)		15	Hot Doggett
1954	"Honey" b/w "The Nearness Of You" (from Moon Dust)			The Doggett Beat For Happy Feet
1954	"Gumbo" b/w "Tara's Theme" (from Moon Dust)			Hot Doggett
1955	"My Reverie" b/w "King Bee" (from The Doggett Beat For Happy Feet)			Moon Dust
1955	"I'll Be Around" b/w "Wild Oats" (from Hot Doggett)			Moon Dust
1955	"Oof!" b/w "Street Scene" (from Moon Dust)			Hot Doggett
1955	"Quaker City" b/w "True Blue"			Hot Doggett
1955	"Shove Off" b/w "You Don't Know What Love Is" (from Moon Dust)			Hot Doggett
1955	"Honey Boy" b/w "Misty Moon" (from Dance Awhile With Doggett)			Hot Doggett
1956	"In A Sentimental Mood" b/w "Who's Who" (from Hot Doggett)			Candle Glow
1956	"Squashy" b/w "We Found Love" (from Candle Glow)			Hot Doggett
1956	"The Bo-Do Rock" b/w "Mean To Me"; Both sides with Earl Bostic			Non-album tracks
1956	"What A Diff'rence A Day Made" b/w "Stella By Starlight" (from Candle Glow)			The Doggett Beat For Happy Feet
1956	"Honky Tonk"—Parts 1 & 2	2	1	Everybody Dance The Honky Tonk
1956	"Bubbins Rock" b/w "Indiana"; Both sides with Earl Bostic			Non-album tracks
1956	"Slow Walk" b/w "Hand In Hand" (from Candle Glow)	26	4	Everybody Dance The Honky Tonk
1956	"Honky Tonk" (Vocals by Tommy Brown) b/w "Peacock Alley" (from Everybody Dance The Honky Tonk)			The Many Moods Of Bill Doggett
1957	"Ram-Bunk-Shush" b/w "Blue Largo" (from The Many Moods Of Bill Doggett)	67	10	The Doggett Beat For Happy Feet
1957	"Chloe" b/w "Number Three" (from Everybody Dance The Honky Tonk)			The Doggett Beat For Happy Feet
1957	"Ding Dong" b/w "Cling To Me" (from Candle Glow)			The Doggett Beat For Happy Feet
1957	"Shindig" b/w "Hammer Head"			The Doggett Beat For Happy Feet
1957	"Soft" b/w "Hot Ginger"	35	11	The Doggett Beat For Happy Feet
1957	"Leaps and Bounds"—Part 1 b/w Part 2		13	Everybody Dance The Honky Tonk
1958	"Hippy Dippy" b/w "Flying Home" (from Dance Awhile With Doggett)			Hold It!
1958	"Boo-Da-Ba" b/w "Pimento"			Hold It!
1958	"Blues For Handy" b/w "How Could You" (from Dance Awhile With Doggett)			Hold It!
1958	"Blip Blop" b/w "Tanya"	82	11	Hold It!
1958	"Hold It" b/w "Birdie"	92	3	Hold It!
1958	"Rainbow Riot"—Part 1 b/w Part 2		15	Hold It!
1959	"Monster Party" b/w "Scott's Bluff"		27	High and Wide
1959	"Ocean Liner" b/w "The Madison"			On Tour
1959	"After Hours" b/w "Big City Drag"			Big City Dance Party
1959	"Yocky Dock"—Part 1 b/w Part 2		30	On Tour
1959	"Goofy Organ" b/w "Zee" (from On Tour)			Back Again With More Bill Doggett
1959	"Smokie"—Part 2 b/w "Evening Dreams" (from On Tour)	95		Back Again With More Bill Doggett
1960	"Raw Turkey" b/w "Back Woods" (Non-album track)			On Tour
1960	"Smoochie" "Big Boy" (from Everybody Dance The Honky Tonk)			Dance Awhile With Doggett
1960	"The Slush" b/w "Buttered Popcorn"			Back Again With More Bill Doggett
1960	"Trav'lin Light" b/w "A Lover's Dream" (from The Many Moods Of Bill Doggett)			For Reminiscent Lovers, Romantic Songs
1960	"Slidin'" b/w "Afternoon Jump" (from Everybody Dance The Honky Tonk)			Back Again With More Bill Doggett
1960	"Earl's Dog" (With Earl Bostic); B-side by Earl Bostic: "Special Delivery Stomp"			Non-album tracks
1960	"(Let's Do) The Hully Gully Twist" b/w "Jackrabbit"	66		3,046 People Danced 'Til 4 AM
1961	"Honky Tonk"—Part 2 b/w "Floyd's Guitar Blues" (from Big City Dance Party)	57	21	Everybody Dance The Honky Tonk
1961	"Let's Do The Continental" b/w "Pony Walk"			The Band With The Beat
1961	"You Can't Sit Down"—Part 1 b/w Part 2			3,046 People Danced 'Til 4 AM
1961	"The Doodle" b/w "Bugle Nose"			Back Again With More Bill Doggett
1961	"High and Wide" b/w "In The Wee Hours"			High and Wide
1962	"The Doodle Twist" b/w "Gene's Dream"			Non-album tracks
1962	"Lady's Choice" b/w "Buster"			Oops! The Swinging Sounds Of Bill Doggett and His Combo
1962	"George Washington Twist" b/w "Eleven O'clock Twist"			The Many Moods Of Bill Doggett
1962	"Moondust" b/w "Teardrops" (from Candle Glow)			Moon Dust
1962	"Oops" b/w "Choo Choo"			Oops! The Swinging Sounds Of Bill Doggett and His Combo
1962	"For All We Know" b/w "Hometown Shout" (from On Tour)			For Reminiscent Lovers, Romantic Songs
1963	"Soda Pop" b/w "Ham Fat"			Prelude To The Blues
1963	"Honky Tonk Bossa Nova"—Part 2 b/w "Ocean Liner Bossa Nova"			American Songs In Bossa Nova Style
1963	"Down Home Bossa Nova" b/w "Si-Si-Nova"			American Songs In Bossa Nova Style
1963	"Groovy Movie" b/w "The Fog" (from The Many Moods Of Bill Doggett)			Impressions
1963	"The Worm" b/w "Hot Fudge"			Fingertips
1964	"Fat Back" b/w "Si Si Cisco"			Non-album tracks
1964	"Night Train"—Part 1 b/w Part 2			Back Again With More Bill Doggett
1964	"Hey, Big Boy, Hey Hey" b/w "The Rail" (from Big City Dance Party)			The Best Of Bill Doggett
1964	"Crackers" b/w "That's Enough, Lock 'Em Up"			The Best Of Bill Doggett
1964	"The Kicker" b/w "Mudcat"			Wow!
1964	"Snuff Box" b/w "Blood Pressure" (Non-album track)			The Best Of Bill Doggett
1965	"Slidin'" b/w "Teardrops"			Bonanza Of 24 Songs
1967	"Sapphire" b/w "Ko-Ko"			Honky Tonk A-La Mod!
1967	"Lovin' Mood" b/w "The Funky Whistler"			Non-album tracks
1969	"Twenty-Five Miles" b/w "For Once In My Life" (Non-album track)			Honky Tonk Popcorn
1969	"Honky Tonk Popcorn" b/w "Honky Tonk"			Honky Tonk Popcorn
1970	"The Nearness Of You" "Moondust"			The Nearness Of You
1971	"Eventide" b/w "In A Sentimental Mood"			Sentimental Mood

=== 7" EPs (all on King) ===
- KEP-259 Bill Doggett, His Organ And Combo, Vol. 1 (1954)
- KEP-325 Bill Doggett, His Organ And Combo, Vol. 2 (1954)
- KEP-326 Bill Doggett, His Organ And Combo, Vol. 3 (1954)
- KEP-334 Bill Doggett, His Organ And Combo, Vol. 4 (1955)
- KEP-346 All Time Christmas Favorites (1955)
- KEP-352 Bill Doggett, His Organ And Combo, Vol. 5 (1955)
- KEP-382 Doggett Dreams, Vol. 6 (1956)
- KEP-388 Doggett Jumps, Vol. 7 (1956)
- KEP-390 Bill Doggett, His Organ And Combo: Honky Tonk! (1956)
- KEP-391 Bill Doggett, Volume 1 (1956)
- KEP-392 Bill Doggett, Volume 2 (1956)
- KEP-393 Bill Doggett, Volume 3 (1956)
- KEP-394 As You Desire Me (Volume 1) (1956)
- KEP-395 As You Desire Me (Volume 2) (1956)
- KEP-396 As You Desire Me (Volume 3) (1956)
- KEP-397 Earl Bostic – Bill Doggett (1956)
- KEP-399 A Salute To Ellington (Volume 1) (1957)
- KEP-400 A Salute To Ellington (Volume 2) (1957)
- KEP-401 A Salute To Ellington (Volume 3) (1957)
- KEP-402 Dame Dreaming (Volume 1) (1957)
- KEP-403 Dame Dreaming (Volume 2) (1957)
- KEP-404 Dame Dreaming (Volume 3) (1957)
- KEP-407 Bill Doggett, His Organ And Combo: Hot Doggett (1957)
- KEP-408 Bill Doggett, His Organ And Combo: Soft (1957)
- KEP-424 Hold It! (Volume 1) (1958)
- KEP-425 Hold It! (Volume 2) (1958)
- KEP-426 Hold It! (Volume 3) (1958)
- KEP-442 High And Wide (Volume 1) (1959)
- KEP-443 High And Wide (Volume 2) (1959)
- KEP-444 High And Wide (Volume 3) (1959)
- KEP-448 Big City Dance Party (Volume 1) (1959)
- KEP-449 Big City Dance Party (Volume 2) (1959)
- KEP-450 Big City Dance Party (Volume 3) (1959)

=== 10" LPs ===
- Bill Doggett, His Organ And Combo, Volume 1 King 295-82 (1954)
- Bill Doggett, His Organ And Combo, Volume 2 King 295-83 (1954)
- All Time Christmas Favorites King 295-89 (1954)
- Sentimentally Yours King 295-102 (1955)

=== 12" LPs ===
- Moon Dust King 395-502 (1956)
- Hot Doggett King 395-514 (1956)
- As You Desire Me King 395-523 (1956) [reissue of King 295-102 plus 4 additional tracks]
- Everybody Dance the Honky Tonk King 395-531 (1956)
- Dame Dreaming King 395-532 (1957)
- A Salute to Ellington King 533 (1957)
- Doggett Beat for Dancing Feet King 557 (1957)
- Candle Glow King 563 (1958)
- Swingin' Easy King 582 (1958)
- Dance Awhile with Doggett King 585 (1958)
- 12 Songs Of Christmas King 600 (1958) [reissue of King 295-89 plus 6 additional tracks]
- Hold It! King 609 (1959)
- High And Wide King 633 (1959)
- Big City Dance Party King 641 (1959)
- Bill Doggett on Tour [this is NOT a live album] King 667 (1959)
- For Reminiscent Lovers, Romantic Songs By Bill Doggett King 706 (1960)
- Back With More Bill Doggett King 723 (1960)
- The Many Moods Of Bill Doggett King 778 (1962)
- Bill Doggett Plays American Songs, Bossa Nova Style King 830 (1963)
- Impressions [compilation] King 868 (1963)
- The Best Of Bill Doggett [compilation] King 908 (1964)
- Bonanza Of 24 Songs [compilation] King 959 (1966)
- Take Your Shot King 1041 (1969) [withdrawn]
- Honky Tonk Popcorn King 1078 (1970)
- The Nearness Of You [compilation] King 1097 (1970)
- Ram-Bunk-Shush [compilation] King 1101 (1970)
- Sentimental Mood [compilation] King 1104 (1971)
- Soft [compilation] King 1108 (1971)
- 14 Original Greatest Hits [compilation; reissued as All His Hits] King-Starday 5009 (1977)
- Charles Brown: PLEASE COME HOME FOR CHRISTMAS [this vocal album includes 4 instrumental tracks by Bill Doggett] King-Starday 5019 (1978)

=== 12" LPs issued by other labels ===
- 3,046 People Danced 'Til 4 A.M. To Bill Doggett [live album] Warner Bros. WS-1404 (1961)
- The Band With The Beat! Warner Bros. WS-1421 (1961)
- Bill Doggett Swings Warner Bros. WS-1452 (1962)
- Rhythm Is My Business (Ella Fitzgerald with Bill Doggett) Verve V6-4056 (1962)
- Oops! The Swinging Sounds Of Bill Doggett Columbia CL-1814/CS-8614 (1962)
- Prelude To The Blues Columbia CL-1942/CS-8742 (1963)
- Fingertips Columbia CL-2082/CS-8882 (1963)
- Wow! ABC-Paramount S-507 (1964)
- Honky Tonk A-La-Mod! Roulette SR-25330 (1966)
- Bill Doggett Disques Black And Blue 33.029 (1971) - released on CD as I Don't Know Much About Love (Black & Blue 59.029) in 1991
- Bill Doggett feat. Eddie Davis & Eddie Vinson Disques Black And Blue 33.138 (1978) - with Eddie "Lockjaw" Davis, Eddie "Cleanhead" Vinson
- Midnight Slows, Vol. 9 Disques Black And Blue 33.145 (1978)
- Midnight Slows, Vol. 10 Disques Black And Blue 33.160 (1979) - with Eddie "Lockjaw" Davis
- Mister Honky Tonk Disques Black And Blue 33.562 (1980)
- The Right Choice After Hours/Ichiban AFT-4112 (1991) - Doggett's last recorded album of original material; also released on CD

=== CD releases/compilations of note ===
- Gon' Doggett Charly R&B CRB-1094 [LP] (1985)
- Trading Licks Charly R&B CD-51 (1987) [shared CD with Earl Bostic; 12 tracks by Doggett and 8 tracks by Bostic; all King material]
- Leaps And Bounds Charly R&B CD-281 (1991)
- The EP Collection See For Miles SEECD-689 (1999)
- Everyday, I Have The Blues (The Definitive Black & Blue Sessions) Black & Blue BB-911 (2002)
- Honky Tonk: The Very Best Of Bill Doggett Collectables 2876 (2004)
- The Chronological Bill Doggett 1952-1953 Classics (Blues & Rhythm Series) 5097 (2004)
- Am I Blue Black & Blue BB-468 (2005)
- The Chronological Bill Doggett 1954 Classics (Blues & Rhythm Series) 5175 (2006)
- Honky Tonk Popcorn Beat Goes Public/BGP CDBGPD-249 (2012) - reissue of King 1078 plus 5 bonus tracks
- Everybody Dance The Honky Tonk/Doggett Beat For Dancing Feet Soul Jam 806174 (2019) 2LP-on-1CD
- Dancing With Doggett: Bill Doggett, His Organ & Combo 1955-1960 Jasmine JASMCD-3142 (2019) - compilation that also includes the entire 3,046 People Danced 'Til 4 A.M. album.

=== As sideman ===
With Ella Fitzgerald

- Lullabies of Birdland (Decca DL-8149, 1945–1955 [rel. 1956]) - includes "Rough Ridin'", "Smooth Sailing", and "Air Mail Special" with Doggett on organ

With Coleman Hawkins

- The Hawk Talks (Decca DL-8127, 1952–1953 [rel. 1955])

With Helen Humes

- Complete 1927–1950 Studio Recordings (Jazz Factory JFCD-22844, 2001) 3-CD set - includes the 5 tracks that Humes recorded with Doggett's octet for Philo/Aladdin in 1945: "Unlucky Woman", "Every Now And Then", "He May Be Your Man", "Blue Prelude", and "Be-Baba-Leba"

With Willis Jackson

- Call of the Gators (Delmark, DD-460, 1949–1950 Apollo recordings [rel. 1992])

With Illinois Jacquet

- Illinois Jacquet And His Tenor Sax (Aladdin LP-708 [10-inch], 1945–1947 [rel. 1954]; Aladdin LP-803 [rel. 1956]; Imperial LP-9184/LP-12184 [rel. 1962])

With Louis Jordan

- Jivin' with Jordan (Proper Box 47, 1938–1951 Decca recordings [rel. 2002]) 4-CD set

With Lucky Millinder

- The Chronological Lucky Millinder & His Orchestra 1941–1942 (Classics 712, 1993)
- The Chronological Lucky Millinder & His Orchestra 1943–1947 (Classics 1026, 1998)

With Paul Quinichette

- The Vice Pres (EmArcy MG-36027, 1951–1952 [rel. 1954])

With Buddy Tate

- Jumping on the West Coast (Black Lion 760175, 1947–1949 Supreme recordings [rel. 1992])

With Lucky Thompson

- The Chronological Lucky Thompson 1944–1947 (Classics 1113, 2000)

== See also ==
- Chicago Blues Festival
