= The King R&B Box Set =

Box set by Various Artists
- Released: February 27, 1996
- Recorded: December 19, 1945 – July 19, 1966
- Genres: R&B; jump blues; doo-wop; soul
- Length: 253:00 (4:13:00)
- Label: King Records
- Producer: Moe Lytle

Professional ratings
Review scores
Source	Rating
AllMusic	4.5/5 stars

The King R&B Box Set is a four-disc box set of King Records' greatest hits.

== Track listing ==
Disc 1
No.	Title	Writer(s)	Artist	Length
1.	"I Know Who Threw the Whiskey in the Well"	Benjamin Clarence Jackson	Bull Moose Jackson & His Band	2:45
2.	"Bye, Bye Baby Blues"	Howard Biggs	The Ravens	2:45
3.	"I Love You, Yes I Do"	Sally Nix; Henry Glover	Bull Moose Jackson & His Buffalo Bearcats	3:00
4.	"Tomorrow Night"	Sam Coslow; Will Grosz	Lonnie Johnson	3:05
5.	"I Want a Bowlegged Woman"	Sally Nix; Henry Glover	Bull Moose Jackson & His Buffalo Bearcats	3:04
6.	"Good Rockin' Tonight"	Roy Brown	Wynonie Harris	2:47
7.	"Long About Midnight"	Roy Brown	Roy Brown	3:05
8.	"Blues for the Red Boy"	Todd Rhodes	Todd Rhodes	2:41
9.	"Pleasing You (As Long as I Live)"	Lonnie Johnson	Lonnie Johnson	3:06
10.	"Rockin' at Midnight"	Roy Brown	Roy Brown	2:44
11.	"Pot Likker"	Todd Rhodes	Todd Rhodes	2:42
12.	"Guess Who"	Mrs. Ivory Joe Hunter	Ivory Joe Hunter	2:59
13.	"All She Wants to Do Is Rock"	Wynonie Harris; Theodore McRae	Wynonie Harris	2:33
14.	"Page Boy Shuffle"	Henry Glover	Joe Thomas	2:40
15.	"Ashes On My Pillow"	Oran Thaddeus Page	Eddie Vinson	2:36
16.	"Why Don't You Haul Off and Love Me"	Wayne Raney; Lonnie Glosson	Bull Moose Jackson	3:01
17.	"Jealous Heart"	Jenny Lou Carson	Ivory Joe Hunter	2:52
18.	"Sittin' On It All The Time"	Henry Glover; Syd Nathan	Wynonie Harris	2:39
19.	"Well, Oh Well"	Henry Glover; Syd Nathan; Myron Bradshaw	Tiny Bradshaw & His Orchestra	2:43
20.	"Hard Luck Blues"	Roy Brown	Roy Brown	3:01
21.	"Good Morning, Judge"	Louis Innis	Wynonie Harris	2:42
22.	"Disgusted"	Mabel Scott	Mabel Scott	2:30
23.	"Sixty Minute Man"	Billy Ward; Rose Marks	The Dominoes	2:31
24.	"Flamingo"	Ted Grouya; Edmund Anderson	Earl Bostic	2:42
25.	"I'm Waiting Just For You"	Carolyn Leigh; Henry Glover	Lucky Millinder	2:38
26.	"Bloodshot Eyes"	Hank Penny; Ruth Hall	Wynonie Harris & His All-Stars	2:42
Total length:				72:33

Disc 2
No.	Title	Writer(s)	Artist	Length
1.	"Mellow Blues (Part 1)"	Henry Glover; Sonny Thompson	Sonny Thompson & His Orchestra	2:46
2.	"Lovin' Machine"	Dave Lambert; Syd Nathan; O. O. Merritt	Wynonie Harris & Todd Rhodes Orchestra	2:28
3.	"Train Kept A-Rollin'"	Myron Bradshaw; Syd Nathan	Myron Bradshaw & His Orchestra	2:47
4.	"It Ain't The Meat"	Henry Glover; Syd Nathan	The Swallows	2:35
5.	"Rockin' With Fes"	Roy Byrd	Roy Byrd (Professor Longhair)	2:03
6.	"Beside You"	Bill Conrad; Herman Denby	The Swallows	2:34
7.	"I'll Drown In My Tears"	Henry Glover	Sonny Thompson	2:53
8.	"My Ding-a-Ling"	Dave Bartholomew	Dave Bartholomew & His Orchestra	2:15
9.	"Have Mercy Baby"	Billy Ward; Rose Marks	The Dominoes	2:22
10.	"Grandpaw Can Boogie Too"	Mario Delagarde; Ravon Darnell	Lil Greenwood & The Four Jacks	2:50
11.	"Moon Rise"	Alonzo Tucker	The Royals	2:49
12.	"Trying"	Billy Vaughan	Todd Rhodes	2:37
13.	"K.C. Loving"	Jerry Leiber; Mike Stoller	Little Willie Littlefield	2:40
14.	"Big Ten Inch Record"	Fred Weismantel	Bull Moose Jackson	2:29
15.	"Baby, I'm Doing It"	Syd Nathan; Henry Glover; Fred Weismantel; Alan Freed	Annisteen Allen	2:29
16.	"Jungle King"	Oran Thaddeus Page	Hot Lips Page & His Orchestra	2:46
17.	"Cherry Wine"	Henry Glover	Little Esther	2:14
18.	"Nervous Man Nervous"	Dwight Davis	Big Jay McNeely	2:35
19.	"Rags To Riches"	Jerry Ross; Richard Adler	Billy Ward & His Dominoes	2:42
20.	"Space Guitar"	Johnny Watson	Young John Watson	2:39
21.	"Work with Me, Annie"	Hank Ballard	The Midnighters	2:46
22.	"Only You (And You Alone)"	Buck Ram	The Platters	3:06
23.	"Sexy Ways"	Hank Ballard	The Midnighters	2:31
24.	"Hearts of Stone"	Rudy Jackson; Eddy Ray	The Charms	2:36
25.	"Rock Love"	Henry Glover	Lula Reed	2:09
26.	"Walking The Blues"	Jack Dupree; Theodore McRae	Jack Dupree & Mr. Bear	2:55
Total length:				67:36

Disc 3
No.	Title	Writer(s)	Artist	Length
1.	"Don't Take It So Hard"	Rose Marie McCoy; Charlie Singleton	Earl "Connely" King	2:43
2.	"All Around The World"	Titus Turner	Little Willie John	2:57
3.	"Ivory Tower"	Jack Fulton; Lois Steele	Otis Williams & His Charms	2:18
4.	"I'm Tore Up"	Ike Turner; Ralph Bass	Billy Gayles	2:23
5.	"Fever"	John Davenport; Eddie Cooley	Little Willie John	2:43
6.	"Honky Tonk (Part I)"	Bill Doggett; Clifford Scott; Shep Sheperd; Billy Butler	Billy Doggett	3:08
7.	"Honky Tonk (Part II)"	Bill Doggett; Clifford Scott; Shep Sheperd; Billy Butler	Billy Doggett	2:38
8.	"It Hurts To Be In Love"	Rudolph Toombs; Julius Edward Dixon	Annie Laurie	2:45
9.	"Ram-Bunk-Shush"	Lucky Millinder; Jimmy Mundy	Billy Doggett	2:32
10.	"Think"	Lowman Pauling	The "5" Royales	2:36
11.	"Miss You So"	Morgan Babb	Tiny Topsy	2:09
12.	"Dedicated To The One I Love"	Ralph Bass; Lowman Pauling	The "5" Royales	2:45
13.	"Talk To Me, Talk To Me"	Joe Seneca	Little Willie John	2:43
14.	"No, No, No"	Bud Johnson; Elliot Green	The Chanters	2:16
15.	"The Twist"	Hank Ballard	Hank Ballard	2:36
16.	"What Makes You So Tough?"	Henry Glover	Teddy Humphries	2:22
17.	"Finger Poppin' Time"	Hank Ballard	Hank Ballard	1:51
18.	"Come On Rock, Little Girl"	Sonny Thompson; Otis Smothers	Smokey Smothers	2:49
19.	"Sleep"	Earl Lebieg	Little Willie John	2:55
20.	"Hide Away"	Fred King; Sonny Thompson	Freddy King	2:37
21.	"Let's Go, Let's Go, Let's Go"	Hank Ballard	Hank Ballard	2:27
22.	"I'm Tore Down"	Sonny Thompson	Freddy King	2:39
23.	"It Won't Be This Way (Always)"	Robert Kelly; Sonny Thompson	The King Pins	2:26
24.	"San-Ho-Zay"	Fred King; Sonny Thompson	Freddy King	2:38
25.	"Gangster of Love"	John Watson	Johnny "Guitar" Watson	2:54
26.	"Papa's Got A Brand New Bag (Part 1)"	James Brown	James Brown	2:05
Total length:				66:55

Disc 4
No.	Title	Writer(s)	Artist	Length
1.	"Me and My Crazy Self"	Henry Glover; Syd Nathan	Lonnie Johnson	2:36
2.	"That's What You're Doin' To Me"	Rose Marks; William Ward	Billy Ward & His Dominoes	2:32
3.	"No Troubles Bubbles"	Unknown	Earl Bostic	4:41
4.	"Wild Stage Of Life"	Unknown	Lula Reed & Sonny Thompson	2:22
5.	"Fever" (with String Overdub)	Eddie Cooley; John Davenport	Little Willie John	2:47
6.	"Dr. Lover"	Beverly Bridge; Rudolph Toombs	Hank Ballard	2:36
7.	"Get That Hump In Your Back"	Mark Ward	Hank Ballard	2:56
8.	"Syd Nathan And Eli Oberstein Address A Sales Meeting, September 22, 1951"	Syd Nathan	Syd Nathan	8:35
9.	"Syd Nathan Talks About His European Trip, October 1952"	Syd Nathan	Syd Nathan	7:50
10.	"Syd Nathan Addresses An A&R Meeting, December 11, 1954"	Syd Nathan	Syd Nathan	9:01
Total length:				45:56

- Track information and credits taken from the album's liner notes.
