= Keep On Churnin' (Till the Butter Comes) =

1952 rhythm and blues song

Single by Wynonie Harris
- B-side: "Married Women Stay Married"
- Released: 1952
- Genre: Rhythm and blues
- Label: King
- Songwriters: Henry Glover, Jester Hairston, Lois Mann

"Keep On Churnin' (Till the Butter Comes)" is a rhythm and blues song written by Henry Glover, Jester Hairston, and Lois Mann. It was first recorded in 1952 by Wynonie Harris, with backing from the Todd Rhodes Orchestra, and released by King Records. The song was also recorded by Hank Ballard and the Midnighters. It has been rated as one of the best double entendre songs of all time.

== Versions ==
=== Original ===
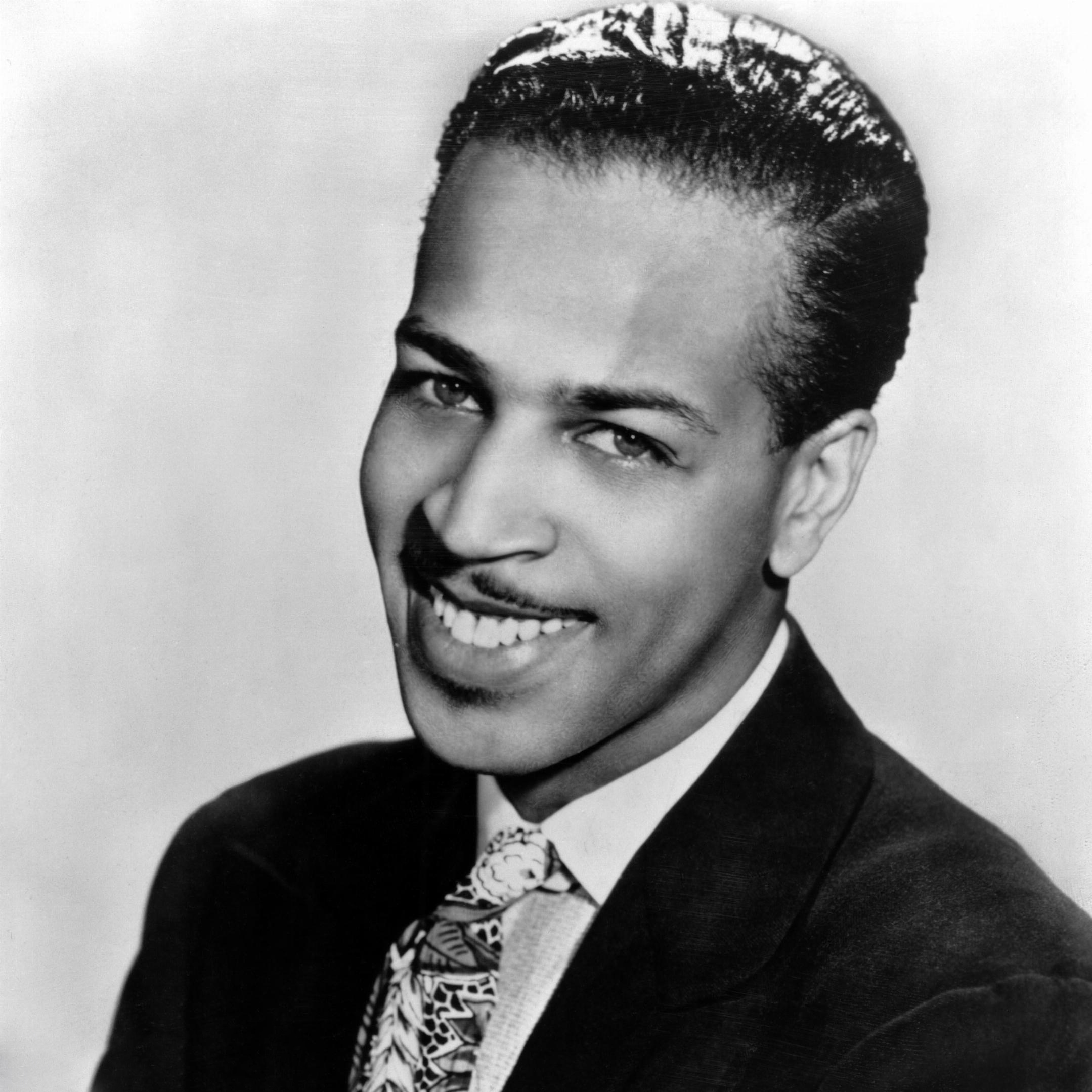
Wynonie Harris

The original version of the song was performed by Wynonie Harris with backing from the Todd Rhodes Orchestra. It was released in 1952 on King Records as disc 4526. Upon its release, Billboard wrote: "Harris shouts out a slick double-entendre blues which should draw lots of coin from his fans."

The song has been re-issued on several compilations, including Risque Rhythm (Rhino, 1992), Bloodshot Eyes: The Best of Wynonie Harris (Rhino, 1994), and Risque Blues: Keep on Churnin' (1996).

=== Covers ===
The song has been covered by various artists, including Hank Ballard and the Midnighters, the Ozark Mountain Daredevils, Duffy Bishop, and The Senders featuring Big Jay McNeeley.

== Lyrics and double entendre ==
The song's lyrics are a double entendre which refer on their face to the process of churning cream to make butter. However, there is a risque, secondary interpretation that is implied by the lyrics. The following passage is illustrative:

Keep on churnin' 'til the butter comes
Keep on pumpin' make the butter flow
Wipe off the paddle and churn some more
Little boy blue come blow your horn

Harris was known for his fondness for double entendre songs. On the release of a greatest hits collection in 1994, one music critic called it "a collection of political incorrectness and marvelously bawdy, double entendre-laden masterworks." Other Harris songs in the dirty blues genre include "Lolly Pop Mama" (1948), "I Like My Baby's Pudding" (1950), and "Sittin on It All the Time" (1950).

Although the song's lyrics are written in the form of an "extended sexual metaphor", they have been cited as part of a trend toward more "open sexuality" in rhythm and blues music of the early 1950s. In 2014, Salon rated "Keep On Churnin'" as one of the 19 greatest double entendre songs of all time.
