= Billy Davis (guitarist) =

American rock and blues guitarist, singer, and songwriter

- Born: J. C. Davis; April 29, 1938 (age 88); Bentonia, Mississippi, U.S.
- Genres: Rock; pop; R&B; blues
- Occupations: Musician; songwriter
- Instruments: Guitar; vocals
- Years active: 1955–present
- Labels: Federal, King, People, Jett Plastic
- Website: billydavisdetroit.com

J. C. Davis (born April 29, 1938), known as Billy Davis, is an American rock and blues guitarist, singer and songwriter, best known for his work with Hank Ballard & the Midnighters. He is a Rock & Roll Hall of Fame inductee.

== Life and career ==
Davis was born in Bentonia, Mississippi and moved to Memphis, Tennessee in childhood. He became inspired to play guitar at the age of 8, when he heard "That's All Right" by Arthur 'Big Boy' Crudup. In 1951, at the age of 13, Davis moved to Detroit, Michigan. There he lived in the predominantly-Black area of the city known as "Black Bottom" and took guitar lessons from Bosie Gatlin, who taught him how to play Muddy Waters' song "Baby, Please Don't Go".

In 1951, Davis met his mother's friend from Mississippi, John Lee Hooker. Hooker in turn introduced Davis and Jackie Wilson, who became close friends and collaborated musically throughout their lives.

In 1957, after graduating from Miller High School in Detroit, he formed Billy Davis & The Upsetters, and they worked for Motown founder Berry Gordy, backing up musicians such as Smokey Robinson and The Miracles. Marv Johnson at live performances.

In 1958, Davis was spotted by Henry Booth, who was a singer for The Midnighters, and he convinced Hank Ballard to hire Davis as the guitarist for the band, as a replacement for Cal Green. Davis played with The Midnighters until the dissolution of the band in 1965, and again during their reunion tours in the 1980s. The Midnighters continued to draw large audiences at a rate of nearly 300 booking dates a year in the early 1960s.

Davis was a flamboyant figure on stage, and he became known for his energetic stage presence, which featured guitar feedback and was accented with spins and twirls, and backflips while he played, and he was also known to play his guitar with his teeth. Davis was considered an actual Midnighter alongside the singers, and not just a member of the backing band, because of his ability to play and sing, and also do the group's dance routines. Ballard would often give Davis 30 minutes to open the shows doing his guitar solos and tricks, before he would take the stage.

In 1959, while playing with The Midnighters in Seattle, Washington, he met Jimi Hendrix, who was just 16 at the time, along with Hendrix's father Al. Davis let Jimi play his guitar and gave him some lessons, which was the first time that Hendrix had played an electric guitar. Inspired by Davis' onstage antics and style, Hendrix soon began adopting the stage act that he became known for, including playing his guitar with his teeth, and playing behind his back. Davis remained friends with both Jimi and Al Hendrix throughout their lifetimes.

In 1959, Davis also met blues guitarist B.B. King, while they were both performing in Atlanta, Georgia, and they remained close friends until King's death in 2015.

In 1960, as Billy Davis and The Legends, he recorded a song for Peacock Records called "Spunky Onions", which was a modified version of a Midnighters instrumental that they would play live. The song was renamed "Spunky Onions" before it was released, so as not to offend anyone with the use of the word funky.

In late 1960, while in Memphis during a stop on their tour, Elvis Presley dispatched two state troopers to Crump Stadium where Hank Ballard and The Midnighters were playing at to bring them to his Graceland mansion for a meetup. Ballard was reluctant at first, and only agreed to go when he saw the rest of the band were going to go without him.

In 1962, Davis was drafted in to the United States Army at Fort Knox, Kentucky, for basic training before heading to South Korea for thirteen months. He entertained at service clubs, playing country music for his Commanding Officers. While in the service, Davis arranged for Hendrix to audition with The Midnighters as his interim replacement and Hendrix joined them for a short time. Davis rejoined The Midnighters upon his return from service and continued until the group disbanded.

After leaving the military, Davis moved to New York City and quickly became a sought-after session guitarist, recording with many artists such as Joe Tex, Isley Brothers, The Drifters, Ben E. King and Millie Jackson, recording for numerous labels, such as Atlantic Records, Buddah Records, Dial Records and Polydor.

Davis played his final performance in the Bahamas with original lineup of The Midnighters in 1965. He then moved back to Memphis, Tennessee and worked briefly for Willie Mitchell at Hi Records.

Davis then moved back to New York, where he did more session work, playing on recordings by many acts including Martha Reeves & the Vandellas. In 1967, Davis played lead guitar on his childhood friend Jackie Wilson's recording "(Your Love Keeps Lifting Me) Higher and Higher", and they also toured together. The song reached No. 1 in the US Billboard R&B chart and, in November, peaked on the Billboard Hot 100 at No. 6. The song was ranked No. 246 on Rolling Stone's list of The 500 Greatest Songs of All Time, and was inducted into the Grammy Hall of Fame in 1999. The track was also sampled by many artists, including The Chemical Brothers.

Davis signed with A&M Records as Billy "Guitar" Davis in 1969, and released "You Put Me in a Groove" backed with "As I Grow Old", as well as "Stanky (Get Funky)" backed with "I've Tried".

Davis got married in 1979, and had two children. In 1974 he moved back to Detroit with the plan of getting out of the music business, and became a trained counselor for underprivileged youth. He effectively retired from playing professionally for nearly nine years, except for occasional gigs and appearances.

In 19832, Sam & Dave called on Davis to put together a band to back them at a concert at Pine Knob, where they were opening for James Brown. Brown, who had been a friend of Davis since the 1950s, gave Hank Ballard's phone number to him, and suggested he call Ballard to reunite The Midnighters. Davis phoned Ballard, which led to The Midnighters reuniting, and they began to tour steadily for the next few years.

He appeared in the 1988 cult movie Tapeheads starring John Cusack and Tim Robbins, as a member of the Swanky Modes Band, featuring Sam Moore (of Sam & Dave) and Junior Walker, along with Hendrix drummer Mitch Mitchell, and Jim Keltner.

In 2001, The Midnighters were among the first to be inducted into the Doo-Wop Hall of Fame, in Boston, Massachusetts.

Davis put together a band in 2003, to record some of his own songs, and he continues to play with them regularly, and has released many recordings of his original music.

In 2012, Davis was inducted into the Rock and Roll Hall of Fame, as a member of The Midnighters. A special subcommittee, appointed by the Rock and Roll Hall of Fame, addressed the question of recognizing members of pioneering groups that had not been inducted when their front men were inducted. As a result of this committee's decision, The Midnighters were automatically inducted into the Rock and Roll Hall of Fame alongside Hank Ballard, who had been inducted in 1990.

In 2015, Davis, as a member of Hank Ballard & the Midnighters, was inducted into the Rhythm and Blues Music Hall of Fame.

To celebrate John Lee Hooker's 100th birthday anniversary in 2017, Davis joined drummer Muruga Booker, P-Funk guitarist Tony "Strat" Thomas, bassist John Sauter, and singer Misty Love to form the Booker Blues All-Stars and released a CD called Booker Plays Hooker.

Davis was introduced to Detroit blues rocker Eliza Neals by his friend Barrett Strong, Davis went on to record "At the Crossroads" (feat. Billy Davis) and perform at the 2017 Ann Arbor Blues and Jazz Festival as Neals featured guest.

On October 12, 2017, Davis was honored with a "70 over 70" award, for his achievements in advancement of art, at a ceremony that was held at The historic Roostertail restaurant in Detroit, Michigan.

In 2017, Davis along with Wayne Craycraft, won a competition put on by the Detroit Blues Society, to represent them by competing in the duo category at the 33rd International Blues Challenge in Memphis, Tennessee, to be held on January 16–20, 2018, where they made it to the semi-finals.

He is a key featured musician in the feature-length documentary film, Paradise Boogie, released in 2018 chronicling the past, present and future of Detroit blues.

Davis currently lives in Southfield, Michigan, and continues to mentor young musicians, and also performs regularly with a few bands, and The Billy Davis Rhythm Machine Band.

On October 19, 2022, Billy Davis and his band played at the Southfield (MI) Public Library event "Jazz & Blues at Your Library".

== Selected discography ==
Hank Ballard & The Midnighters albums

- Singin' And Swingin (1959)
- Mr. Rhythm And Blues (1960)
- The One And Only (1960)
- Dance Along (1961)
- Spotlight On Hank Ballard (1961)
- Hank Ballard Sings 24 Great Songs (1961)
- Let's Go Again (1961)
- The Twistin' Fools (1962)
- Jumpin (1962)
- The 1963 Sound Of Hank Ballard and the Midnighters (1963)
- Those Lazy, Lazy Days (1963)
- Volume 2 (1963)
- Live at the Palais (1963)
- 24 Hit Tunes (1963)
- From Love To Tears (1963)
- Hank Ballard & the Midnighters – Nothing But Good (1952–1962) (5-CD box set) (2009)

Hank Ballard & The Midnighters charted singles

- "Teardrops on Your Letter / The Twist" (1959)
- "Kansas City" (1959)
- "The Coffee Grind" (1960)
- "Finger Poppin' Time" (1960)
- "The Twist" (reissue) (1960)
- "Let's Go, Let's Go, Let's Go" (1960)
- "The Hoochi Coochi Coo" (1961)
- "Let's Go Again (Where We Went Last Night)" (1961)
- "The Continental Walk" (1961)
- "The Switch-a-Roo" (1961)
- "The Float" (1961)
- "Nothing but Good / Keep On Dancing" (1961)
- "Do You Know How to Twist" (1962)

Solo recordings

- "Spunky Onions / Goodbye Jesse" (1960)
- "Stanky (Get Funky) / I've Tried" (1969)
- "You Put Me in a Groove / As I Grow Old" (1969)
- "Blue Teardrops" (2004)
- "Coming for You" (2006)
- "Merry Christmas to the World" (2006)
- "It Ain't Easy" (2007)
- "Mr. Rock N Roll" (2009)
- "Blackballed" (2009)
- "I Remember" (2016)
- Billy Davis (2017)
