= Cherry Wine (disambiguation) =

"Cherry Wine" is a 2012 song by American rapper Nas.

Cherry Wine may also refer to:

- Cherry wine, a type of fruit wine made with cherries
- "Cherry Wine" (Hozier song), a 2016 song by Hozier
- "Cherry Wine" (Little Esther song), a 1953 song by Little Esther
- Cherry Wine (horse), second finisher in the 2016 Preakness Stakes

== See also ==
- "Sweet Cherry Wine", a 1969 song by Tommy James and the Shondells
- Cheerwine, a cherry-flavored soft drink
