= You Put the Hurt On Me =

You Put the Hurt On Me is an EP released by the Spencer Davis Group in 1965 as Fontana Records, TE 17444, with liner notes by Chris Blackwell. The disc peaked on the British EP charts at # 4 in October 1965.

== Songs ==
1. "She Put the Hurt On Me" (L. Nelson)
2. "I'm Getting Better" (E. Bruce)
3. "I'll Drown In My Own Tears", (Henry Glover)
4. "Goodbye Stevie" (Steve Winwood)

Fontana Records, a BPR Production, TE 17444 (1965)

== Personnel ==
- Spencer Davis, vocals, rhythm guitar
- Stevie Winwood, vocals, piano and lead guitar
- Muff Winwood, bass guitar
- Pete York, drums
