= Bernard Besman =

- Besman c. 1937

Background information
- Born: October 8, 1912; Kiev, Russian Empire
- Origin: Detroit, Michigan, U.S.
- Died: January 10, 2003 (aged 90) Los Angeles, California, U.S.
- Occupations: Record producer; distributor
- Years active: 1920s–1990s
- Label: Sensation

Bernard Besman (October 8, 1912 – January 10, 2003) was an American record producer and distributor who established Sensation Records, an early independent record label in Detroit, Michigan. He was the first to record John Lee Hooker, and is officially credited with co-writing some of Hooker's songs.

== Early life ==
Besman was born into a Jewish family in Kiev, then in the Russian Empire. In the aftermath of the First World War and the Polish-Soviet War, he and his family fled Kiev in 1921, and traveled to London where Besman attended school in the East End and learned piano. The family moved to Detroit in 1926, and Besman began playing sweet jazz and dance music in hotels and resorts, leading his own small group, and made recordings in 1936. He began operating a booking agency before World War II, and then booked bands for the Special Services.

== Career ==
After the war, Besman linked up with accountant John Kaplan to buy an existing company, Pan American Record Distributing, in 1946. The company sold mostly to the African American market, and Besman established himself as a record plugger, promoting records to radio stations. Besman and Kaplan also started Sensation Records, taking its name from the local Sensation Lounge nightclub. Musicians signed to Sensation Records included Todd Rhodes, Russell Jacquet, The Harmonicats, T. J. Fowler, and Milt Jackson. Some of Rhodes' recordings featured singers Connie Allen and LaVern Baker. Besman was responsible for artists and repertoire, and Kaplan for financial arrangements. They arranged a distribution deal for Sensation through Vitacoustic Records, another local label, and when that fell through arranged distribution through King Records of Cincinnati.

In late 1948, Besman heard demo records by local blues musician John Lee Hooker, and as a result produced Hooker's first recording session with engineer Joe Siracuse. The session yielded the hit single "Boogie Chillen'". Hooker was recorded as a solo performer, and in order to produce a stronger sound, Besman said:

I knew I had to do something. So first we amplified his guitar. He had an old Stella and no amp. We put a mike onto his guitar, and we put a speaker—this was a tiny two room studio, remember—we put it in a toilet bowl next door, actually in a toilet bowl. Then we put a mike under that so the sound would bounce off the water—I wanted an echo effect. Then the sound went back into a speaker in the studio, came out of that, and got picked up along with his voice. I put a board under his feet to make his tapping louder, and put a mike down there.

The resulting record was leased to Modern Records in Los Angeles for release and distribution, and became a million-seller. As with Hooker’s other recordings, Besman gave himself a co-writer credit – though Hooker strongly rejected the idea that Besman was creatively involved in writing the songs – as well as the publishing rights. Some of Hooker's other early recordings, including "Burnin' Hell" and "Huckle Up Baby", were released on the Sensation label and became modestly successful. Besman retained the rights to all Hooker's recordings on the label.

The Sensation label issued its last records in late 1950. After the success of "Boogie Chillen'", Besman continued to record Hooker, including "I'm in the Mood", his second R&B number one hit in 1951, on which Hooker performed with second guitarist Eddie Kirkland, and Besman double-tracked Hooker's vocals and guitar.

In 1952, Besman was diagnosed with a serious illness, sold his share in the Sensation label, and moved to Los Angeles. After he recovered, he was involved in his cousin's business, marketing painting by numbers kits. Besman retained links with John Lee Hooker, and in 1961 produced a self-titled album by Hooker in Culver City, California. He also remained in the children's toy business, and in the early 1970s held the franchise for Bozo the Clown merchandise.

In the early 1970s, Besman began to license many of his unreleased John Lee Hooker recordings to various labels including Specialty Records, United Artists and the small Greene Bottle label. He later sold the remainder of his tapes and acetates to Ace Records in the early 1990s.

In 1992, Besman filed a lawsuit against the members of ZZ Top, alleging that their 1973 song "La Grange" infringed on "Boogie Chillen'" by John Lee Hooker. A federal judge dismissed the case in 1995.

All of Hooker's recordings with Besman on Sensation Records between 1948 and 1952 (not including the material issued on United Artists and Greene Bottle), remastered and including some alternate and unedited takes not previously issued, were released as a box set by Ace Records in 2020.

== Personal life ==
Besman died in Los Angeles on January 10, 2003, aged 90.
