= Who Threw the Whiskey in the Well =

1945 big band song by Eddie DeLange and Johnny Brooks

Single by Lucky Millinder and His Orchestra, Wynonie Harris
- B-side: "Shipyard Social Function"
- Released: 1945
- Genre: big band
- Length: 2:57
- Label: Decca
- Songwriters: Eddie DeLange; Johnny Brooks

"Who Threw the Whiskey in the Well" is a 1945 song performed by Lucky Millinder and His Orchestra. With Wynonie Harris on vocals, "Who Threw the Whiskey in the Well" became Millinder's most successful release on both the pop and R&B charts. The song went to number one on the R&B Jukebox chart and number seven on the pop chart. Louis Prima recorded a version soon after.

On December 19, 1945, Bull Moose Jackson recorded an answer-song to "Who Threw the Whiskey in the Well"; "I Know Who Threw the Whiskey In the Well" was recorded in New York, for the Queen label (Queen #4116) with (part of) the Lucky Millinder Band musicians. These included Harold "Money" Johnson (trumpet), Bernie Peacock (alto saxophone), Clarence "Bullmoose" Jackson, and Sam "The Man" Taylor (tenor saxophone), Sir Charles Thompson (piano), Bernard Mackey (guitar), Beverly Peer (bass), and Dave "Panama" Francis (drums).

== Popular culture ==
- A snippet of this recording is heard at the end of the song "Amazing" from Aerosmith's album Get a Grip.
