= Henry Glover =

American songwriter, arranger, record producer and trumpet player (1921–1991)

Background information
- Born: Henry Bernard Glover; May 21, 1921; Hot Springs, Arkansas, U.S.
- Died: April 7, 1991 (aged 69) St. Albans, New York, U.S.
- Occupations: Songwriter, arranger, record producer, trumpeter
- Instrument: Trumpet
- Years active: Late 1940s–1991

Henry Bernard Glover (May 21, 1921 – April 7, 1991) was an American songwriter, arranger, record producer and trumpet player. In the music industry of the time, Glover was one of the most successful and influential black executives. He gained eminence in the late 1940s, primarily working for the independent (and white-owned) King label. His duties included operating as a producer, arranger, songwriter (occasionally utilizing the alias of Henry Bernard), engineer, trumpet player, talent scout, A&R man, studio constructor, while later in his career he became the owner of his own label. Glover worked with country, blues, R&B, pop, rock, and jazz musicians, and he helped King Records to become one of the largest independent labels of its time. Thanks to the efforts of family, friends and fans, Glover's hometown of Hot Springs, Arkansas celebrated the 100th anniversary of his birth in 2021 by inducting him into the downtown "Walk of Fame," the Mayor's "Proclamation," "Key to the City," and named a parklet "Henry Glover Way," along Black Broadway after him. In 2018, Glover was recognized with a Lifetime Achievement Award by the King Records 75th Anniversary. In 2013, he was inducted into the Blues Hall of Fame.

== Career ==
Glover was born in Hot Springs, Arkansas. As a youngster, he listened to various genres of music on local radio, and learned to play the trumpet. Following high school and college, he joined Buddy Johnson's big band in 1944, and Lucky Millinder's orchestra the following year. In the latter capacity Glover met Syd Nathan, who hired Glover as an A&R man at King Records. As well as A&R duties, Glover helped to construct King's first recording studio.

He went on to produce sessions for the label's established roster of country musicians, including The Delmore Brothers, Hawkshaw Hawkins, Cowboy Copas, Moon Mullican, Grandpa Jones, and The York Brothers. Glover co-wrote "Blues Stay Away from Me" with the Delmore Brothers. Glover's work with Bull Moose Jackson's on his 1945 cover of Joe Liggins' "The Honeydripper" followed, opening up success with a black audience. Further releases produced by Glover appeared in the next couple of years on King's subsidiary label, Queen Records.

In 1947, Queen merged with King Records, heralding further racial integration. Glover's understanding of jump blues and rhythm and blues led to him signing Lucky Millinder plus Tiny Bradshaw, and he went on to produce both Bill Doggett and Wynonie Harris. Glover later produced or wrote music for Hank Ballard & The Midnighters ("Teardrops on Your Letter"), Little Willie John ("Fever"), James Brown, and The Swallows. Glover's own song "Drown in My Own Tears", originally recorded by Lula Reed, was later successfully covered by Ray Charles.

Glover split with King Records in 1958, and joined the Roulette label. He subsequently worked with Sarah Vaughan, Dinah Washington, Sonny Stitt and Ronnie Hawkins. Glover also encouraged the latter's backing band, the Hawks, to pursue their own ambitions. Glover later organised the release of an early single of theirs, when they were billed as The Canadian Squires, prior to their becoming known as The Band.

In 1960, Billy Bland recorded his version of "Let the Little Girl Dance" with Glover, and it was released as a single. It was a hit in the US, peaking at No. 11 on the Black Singles chart and No. 7 on the Billboard Hot 100.

In early April 1961, Roulette Records president Morris Levy reactivated New York-based American record label Gee Records as a division of Roulette Records and appointed Glover artist and repertoire chief of Gee Records. Glover's first release was "Heart and Soul," a 1961 rhythm and blues rearrangement of the 1938 romantic-pop standard of the same name. "Heart and Soul" (1961) reached No. 18 on the Billboard Hot 100 popular chart in July of that year and appeared in the 1973 American comedy-drama film, American Graffiti. Glover had further success in 1961 in co-writing Joey Dee and the Starliters' number one "Peppermint Twist"; and two years later, The Rivieras recorded Glover's song "California Sun" resulting in a Top 5 hit. Glover worked with Louisiana Red during the early 1960s, and also created for a short period his own record label. On it Glover recorded both Larry Dale and Titus Turner. Glover also produced The Essex in 1963 and 1964.

Glover later returned to King Records and briefly acted as label head until it was bought by Starday.

In 1975, Levon Helm and Glover co-founded a new label, RCO Productions, which released two of Helm's solo projects. The same year Glover produced The Muddy Waters Woodstock Album, which won a Grammy, and the following year Paul Butterfield's, Put It in Your Ear. Also in 1976 Glover partly arranged with Garth Hudson, Howard Johnson, Tom Malone, John Simon and Allen Toussaint the horn section on The Band's concert, The Last Waltz, and thus the subsequent album, The Last Waltz.

In 1986 Glover was inducted into the Alabama Jazz Hall of Fame.

== Death ==
Glover died of a heart attack in April 1991, in St. Albans, New York, at the age of 69. He was survived by his wife, Doris, and a son, Ware and two daughters, Sherry and Leslie.

== Songwriting credits ==
- "All My Love Belongs to You" – recorded by Bull Moose Jackson and The Platters
- "Annie Had a Baby" – recorded by Hank Ballard (as The Midnighters)
- "Baby, I'm Doin' It" – recorded by Annisteen Allen
- "Baby, You're Driving Me Crazy" – recorded by Joey Dee and the Starliters
- "Blues So Bad" – recorded by Levon Helm
- "Blues Stay Away from Me" – recorded by B. B. King, Merle Haggard, Harry James, k.d. lang and others
- "Bongo Boogie" – recorded by Lucky Millinder
- "Boom Diddy Boom Boom" – recorded by Otis Williams and the Charms
- "Bradshaw Boogie" – recorded by Tiny Bradshaw
- "Breaking Up the House" – recorded by Tiny Bradshaw
- "Bump on a Log" – recorded by Lula Reed
- "California Sun" – recorded by The Rivieras, The Crickets, The Ramones and The Dictators
- "Cherry Wine" – recorded by Esther Phillips
- "Clap Your Hands" – recorded by Lucky Millinder
- "D' Natural Blues" – recorded by Lucky Millinder
- "Down Boy Down" – recorded by Wynonie Harris
- "Drown in My Own Tears" – recorded by Ray Charles, Aretha Franklin, Etta James, Dinah Washington, Johnny Winter, Billy Preston and others
- "End of the Rainbow" – recorded by Moon Mullican
- "Everybody Do the Chicken" – recorded by The Five Jets
- "Get Up Betty Jean" – (co-written with Toombs & Martin) – recorded by Titus Turner
- "Henry's Got Flat Feet (Can't Dance No More)" – recorded by Hank Ballard (as The Midnighters)
- "House With No Windows" – recorded by Hank Ballard
- "I Can't Go On (Without You)" – recorded by Ella Fitzgerald
- "I Done It" – recorded by Moon Mullican
- "I Love You, Yes I Do" – recorded by The Platters, Dinah Washington, James Brown
- "I Want a Bowlegged Woman" – recorded by Bull Moose Jackson
- "I Want to Love You Baby" – recorded by Wynonie Harris
- "I'll Be There" – recorded by Esther Phillips
- "I'm Going to Have Myself a Ball" – recorded by Tiny Bradshaw
- "I'm Set in My Ways" – (co-written with Singleton) – recorded by Titus Turner
- "I'm Sticking With You, Baby" – recorded by Little Willie John, Joe Williams
- "I'm Waiting Just for You" – recorded by Rosemary Clooney
- "I've Been Around" – recorded by Tiny Bradshaw
- "If I Thought You Needed Me" – recorded by Little Willie John
- "If You Don't Think I'm Sinking" – recorded by Eddie Vinson
- "It Ain't the Meat (It's the Motion)" – recorded by Bull Moose Jackson, Maria Muldaur, Southside Johnny
- "Jealous Love" – recorded by Lula Reed
- "Keep On Churnin' (Till the Butter Comes)" – recorded by Wynonie Harris
- "Let the Little Girl Dance" - recorded by Billy Bland
- "Let's Call It a Day" – recorded by Lula Reed
- "Lonesome Train" - recorded by Eddie "Cleanhead" Vinson
- "Love, Life and Money" – (co-written with Julius Dixson) – recorded by Little Willie John, Johnny Winter, Marianne Faithfull
- "Lovin' Machine" – recorded by Wynonie Harris
- "Me and my Crazy Self" – recorded by Lonnie Johnson, Jeff Healey
- "The More We Get Together" – (co-written with Titus Turner) – recorded by Titus Turner
- "My Little Baby" – (co-written with Nix) – recorded by Charles Brown and Amos Milburn
- "My Tears Will Pour Just Like Rain" – recorded by Moon Mullican
- "My Tissue Paper Heart" – (co-written with Mann) – recorded by Jimmie Osbourne
- "Nobody's Lovin' Me" – recorded by The Swallows, Lonnie Johnson
- "No Stranger" – recorded by Moon Mullican
- "One Big Mouth (Two Big Ears)" – recorded by Joe Jones
- "Peppermint Twist" – recorded by Joey Dee and the Starliters, Sweet
- "Quiet Whiskey" – recorded by Wynonie Harris
- "Rain Down Tears" – recorded by Levon Helm, Hank Ballard
- "Ram-Bunk-Shush" – recorded by Bill Doggett, The Ventures
- "Rheumatism Boogie" – recorded by Moon Mullican
- "Rock Love" – recorded by Lula Reed
- "Rocket to the Moon" – recorded by Moon Mullican, Don Airey and Jools Holland
- "Seven Nights to Rock" – recorded by Moon Mullican, Nick Lowe
- "She's Alright" – recorded by Sam & Dave
- "Silent George" – recorded by Lucky Millinder and Myra Johnson
- "Sioux Rock" – (co-written with Ray Felder) – recorded by The Sugar Canes
- "Soulville" – recorded by Dinah Washington, Aretha Franklin, The Zombies
- "Teardrops on Your Letter" – recorded by Hank Ballard and Freddie King
- "That Was Me" – recorded by The Fiestas
- "To Forget About You" – recorded by Dinah Washington
- "Top Ten Rock" – (co-written with Fuller Todd) – recorded by Fuller Todd
- "Tremblin'" – recorded by Wynonie Harris
- "You Can Run but You Can't Hide" – recorded by Paul Butterfield

== See also ==
- List of number-one rhythm and blues hits (United States)
