= The Wallflower (Dance with Me, Henry) =

Single by Etta James and the Peaches
- B-side: "Hold Me, Squeeze Me"
- Released: 1955
- Recorded: 1954
- Genre: Rhythm and blues
- Length: 3:07
- Label: Modern
- Songwriters: Johnny Otis; Hank Ballard; Etta James

Etta James and the Peaches singles chronology
"The Wallflower" (1955)	"Hey Henry" (1955)

"The Wallflower" (also known as "Roll with Me, Henry" and "Dance with Me, Henry") is a 1955 song by Etta James. It was one of several answer songs to "Work with Me, Annie" and has the same 12-bar blues form.

== Lyrics and release ==
The song was written by Johnny Otis, Hank Ballard, and Etta James. Etta James recorded it for Modern Records, with uncredited vocal responses from Richard Berry. It was popularly known as "Roll with Me Henry". This original version was considered too risqué to play on pop radio stations.

The song is a dialogue between "Henry" and the singer:

- Hey baby, whatta I have to do to make you love me too?
- You've got to roll with me Henry

The context is the dance floor. The Midnighters also recorded an "answer to the answer": "Henry's Got Flat Feet (Can't Dance No More)".

Under the title "The Wallflower," the single became a rhythm and blues hit, topping the US Billboard R&B chart for four weeks. On Billboard's Top R&B Records of 1955 list, it ranked No. 6 according to retail sales, No. 3 according to disk jockey plays and No. 15 according to jukebox plays.

The song was reissued as "Roll with Me, Henry" on Kent Records in 1960. In 2008, Etta James received a Grammy Hall of Fame Award for her 1955 recording.

== Georgia Gibbs version ==
In 1955, the song was covered for the pop market by Georgia Gibbs, with uncredited vocal responses from Thurl Ravenscroft, under the title "Dance with Me Henry." That version charted, hitting the top five of several pop charts, including No. 1 on the Most Played In Juke Boxes chart on May 14, 1955, spending three weeks on top of that chart. In 1958, Etta James recorded her own cover of "Dance with Me Henry".

== The Goons version ==
On 29 June 1955, the song was recorded by two of The Goons in an interpretation of the Georgia Gibbs version, the record credit being: "Dance With Me Henry" - Minnie Bannister & Henry Crun (Peter Sellers & Spike Milligan), produced by Beatles Producer George Martin. It was the B-side to "Unchained Melody", credited to Bluebottle and Eccles - again produced by George Martin. Neither track was released at the time, eventually being released in 1990 as a 7-inch single on the EMI label - EM 146.
