= Sittin' on It All the Time =

Single by Wynonie Harris
- B-side: "Blow Your Brains Out"
- Released: 1950
- Genre: R&B Jump Blues
- Label: King
- Songwriters: Sydney Mann, Henry Bernard

"Sittin' on It All the Time" is a song written by Sydney Mann and Henry Bernard and performed by Wynonie Harris. It was released on King Records in January 1950 with "Blow Your Brains Out" as the "B" side. It peaked at No. 3 on the Billboard R&B chart. It ranked No. 30 on the Billboard year-end juke box chart of 1950.

The lyrics tell about an "old maid" who waited until she was 63 years old before she started running wild. She had her chance for love and romance, but she was running from men when she was 10 and "kept on sittin' on it all the time." She was a natural queen at 15 but "kept sittin' on it." The lyrics track her at different ages. At age 44, men was still knockin' at her door, but she kept sittin' on it. Now she's 63, and "you're too old for me, so keep sittin' on it all the time!"

The song was also covered by Henry Glover.

The song was included in multiple compilation albums, including American Hot Wax Original Soundtrack (1978), Bloodshot Eyes: The Best of Wynonie Harris (1993), Risque Blues: MY Ding-a-Ling (1996), Wynonie Harris 1947-1949 (2001), All She Wants To Do Is Rock (2001), and Rock, Mr. Blues! The King & Atco Recorings 1949-1956.
