= Grantley Dee =

- Born: Grantley John Mark De Zoete; 2 January 1946; Windsor
- Died: 7 February 2005 (aged 59) Mount Eliza

Grantley Dee (1946–2005) was an Australian musician and DJ.

Dee, who was blind, began his radio career at age 16 when he was recruited by 3AK, in part for publicity. He begin with a show on Sundays titled Turntable 63 before soon working 7 days a week.

As a singer Dee had chart success with Wild One and Let the Little Girl Dance with initial sales of the latter almost going gold. In 1967 he released a self-titled album. In the 80s he played with the Allstars, releasing four more albums with them.
