= Let the Little Girl Dance =

Single by Billy Bland
- B-side: "Sweet Thing"
- Released: January 1960
- Genre: R&B
- Length: 2:21
- Label: Old Town
- Songwriters: Carl Spencer, Henry Glover

Billy Bland singles chronology
"Grandmaw Gave a Party" (1959)	"Let the Little Girl Dance" (1960)	"Pardon Me" (1960)

"Let the Little Girl Dance" is a song written by Carl Spencer and Henry Glover and performed by Billy Bland. It reached No. 7 on the U.S. pop chart, No. 11 on the U.S. R&B chart, and No. 15 on the UK Singles Chart in 1960.

The song ranked No. 51 on Billboard magazine's Top 100 singles of 1960.

== Other versions ==
- Ernest Tubb, as the B-side to his 1960 single "Everybody's Somebody's Fool".
- Toni Williams, featuring The Tremellos, as a single in 1960 in New Zealand. It did not chart.
- Grantley Dee, as a single in 1966 in Australia; it charted No. 2 Melbourne, No. 3 Brisbane, and No. 1 Perth.
- Hopeton Lewis, as a single in 1967 in the UK, but it did not chart.
- A rendering by Jackie Robinson was released on the 1998 compilation album Get on Up!: Joe Gibbs Rocksteady.
