= Billy Bland (singer) =

American singer-songwriter

- Born: April 5, 1932; Wilmington, North Carolina, U.S.
- Died: March 22, 2017 (aged 84)
- Genres: R&B
- Occupations: Singer, songwriter
- Years active: 1948–1965
- Label: Old Town Records
- Formerly of: The Four Bees

Billy Bland (April 5, 1932 – March 22, 2017) was an American R&B singer and songwriter.

== Life and career ==
Bland, the youngest of 19 children, first sang professionally in 1947 in New York City, and sang with a group called The Bees in the 1950s on New Orleans's Imperial Records. In 1954, "Toy Bell" by the group caused some unrest by veering into the dirty blues genre. Dave Bartholomew brought them to New Orleans, where they recorded a song he had written and recorded twice before: firstly in 1952 for King Records as "My Ding-a-Ling", and later that year for Imperial as "Little Girl Sing Ting-A-Ling". Bland later pursued a solo career.

In 1960, Bland heard Titus Turner recording the song "Let the Little Girl Dance" in the studio, and demonstrated for Turner how to sing it (along with guitarist Mickey Baker and other session musicians). The event was recorded by record producer Henry Glover, and was eventually released as a single. The tune was a hit in the US, peaking at number 11 on the US Billboard R&B chart. and number 7 on the Billboard Hot 100. Bland had two other minor hits that year, "Harmony" (U.S. Hot 100 number 91) and "You Were Born to Be Loved" (U.S. Hot 100 number 94). He recorded until 1963 for Old Town, and then quit the music industry.

In the 1980s, he ran a soul food restaurant in Harlem.

Bland died on March 22, 2017, at the age of 84.

== Discography ==
=== Singles ===
Year	Title	Peak chart positions		
Year	Title	US Pop	US R&B	UK
1955	"Oh, You for Me"	―	―	―
1955	"If I Could Be Your Man"	―	―	―
1960	"Everything That Shines Ain't Gold"	―	―	―
1960	"Let the Little Girl Dance"	7	11	15
1960	"You Were Born to Be Loved"	94	―	―
1960	"Harmony"	91	―	―
1961	"My Heart's on Fire"	90	―	―
1961	"All I Wanna Do Is Cry"	―	―	―
1961	"I Cross My Heart"	―	―	―
1963	"A Little Touch of Your Love"	―	―	―
1963	"Darling Won't You Think of Me"	―	―	―
1965	"She's Already Married"	―	―	―
"—" denotes releases that did not chart or were not released in that territory.
