= Toni Williams =

Cook Island-born New Zealand pop singer

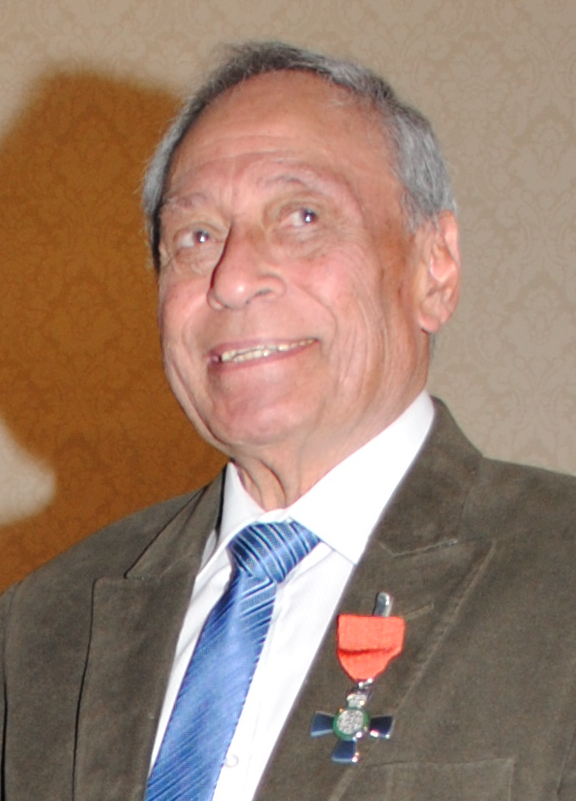
Williams in 2010

Henry Anthony Williams MNZM (28 May 1939 – 1 October 2016), known professionally as Toni Williams or Antoni Williams, was a Cook Island-born New Zealand pop singer, who began singing at the Gandhi Hall in Auckland City where he became a local sensation.

== Background ==
Born Henry Anthony Williams on 28 May 1939, in Parekura in the Avarua District of Rarotonga, he was the son of a doctor. Owing to his father's being employed by the New Zealand government, Williams' childhood was taken up by moving between Rarotonga and the outer Cook Islands. He moved to Auckland in 1950 at the age of 11 for schooling. As a youngster he injured himself playing football. With a hip condition as a result, he stayed at the Wilson Home for Crippled Children for a period of time.

== Career ==
Williams cited his interest in the guitar and singing as coming from spending 13 months in hospital as a result of a football accident. Not long after his hospitalisation, Williams formed the Housewarmers, which was a little group that performed at small family events. Two years later, the band by Williams' direction became Toni Williams and The Tremellos. After that things started happening, and he toured New Zealand under the promoter Harry M. Miller.

In 1960 his single, "Cradle Of Love" bw "Brush Those Tears From Your Eyes" was released on the La Gloria label. Also that same year, "Let the Little Girl Dance" bw "In A Mansion Stands My Love", and "Endlessly"/"Is A Bluebird Blue" were released by La Gloria. Williams toured with the Howard Morrison Quartet, and in 1965 he married the Miss Canterbury beauty pageant winner.

In 1972, his single "Tellabout" (composed by Tony McCarthy), was an APRA Silver Scroll-nominated song.

In the 2010 Queen's Birthday Honours, Williams was appointed a Member of the New Zealand Order of Merit for services to entertainment

== Death ==
Williams died in Christchurch on 1 October 2016, aged 77.

== Singles ==
NZ Singles
Name	Title	Release info	Year	Notes
Toni Williams	""Cradle Of Love" / "Brush Those Tears From Your Eyes	La Gloria G.S.P.-012	1960	
Toni Williams	"Let the Little Girl Dance" / "In A Mansion Stands My Love"	La Gloria GSP-021	1960	
Toni Williams	" Endlessly" / "Is A Bluebird Blue"	La Gloria GSP-023	1960	
Toni Williams	"Look Over The Hill" / "Down The River Of Golden Dreams"	La Gloria GSP-030	1961	
Toni Williams	"Little Boy Sad" / "The Search Is Over"	La Gloria GSP-035	1961	
Toni Williams	"Runnin' Scared" / "Monsoon"	La Gloria GSP-039	1961	
Toni Williams	"Angel Of Love" / "I'm Tired Of The Rain"	La Gloria GSP-044	1961	
Toni Williams	"You Are My Sunshine" / "Love Came to Me"	Viking 112	1962	
Antoni Williams	"Twistin' the Night Away" / "Think Twice"	La Gloria GSP-052	1962	
Antoni Williams	"Harbour Lights" / "Daddy's Little Boy"	La Gloria GSP-057	1962	
Antoni Williams	"How Many Nights, How Many Days" / "For The First Time In My Life"	La Gloria GSP058	1962	
Antoni Williams	"Handsome Guy" / "For The First Time In My Life"	La Gloria GSP058	1962	
Antoni Williams	"Handsome Guy" / "Amor"	La Gloria GSP-059	1962	
Antoni Williams	"Remember You" / "Dance On Little Girl"	La Gloria GSP-064	1962	
Antoni Williams	"Ole Man M-I-S-S-I-S-S-I-P-P-" / "Couldn't That Just Tear Your Heart Out"	La Gloria GSP-075	1963	
Tony Williams	"If You Lose Her" / "It's Alright Now"	Sunshine QK-1728	1967	
Toni Williams	"There's No Limit" / "The Son of Hickory Holler's Tramp"	Zodiac 45-1340	1968	
Toni Williams	"Sad, Lonely And Blue" / "Please Send Me Someone To Love"	Zodiac Z45/1334	1968	
Toni Williams	"I'll Be Your Baby Tonight" / "Ten Guitars"	Zodiac Z45-1341	1969	
Toni Williams	"Dominating Man" / "Beautiful Smile"	Zodiac Z 451347	1969	
Toni Williams	"Patterns Of Sunlight" / "Walking In The Sand"	Zodiac Z 1361	1970	
Tony Williams	"I Love My Children" / "You're Not The Crying Kind"	Zodiac Z/1348	1970	
Toni Williams	"Tying The Pieces Together" / "(There'll Come A Day When) Ev'ry Little Bit Hurts"	Zodiac Z 1377	1972	
Toni Williams	"Rose (Can I Share A Bed With You?)" / "Poor Man's Blues"	Interfusion K 78	1976	[#11 NZ]
Tony Williams	"Rose (Can I Share A Bed With You?)" / "Poor Man's Blues"	Festival K-78	1977	
Toni Williams	"The One I Sing My Love Songs To" / "Amanda"	Festival K 79	1977	[#7 NZ]
Toni Williams	"Don't Let Me Know" / "She's In Love With A Rodeo Man"	Festival K 86	1977	
