= Lula Reed =

American singer (1926–2008)

- Also known as: Lulu Reed
- Born: Lula Marietta McClelland; March 21, 1926; Mingo Junction, Jefferson County, Ohio, U.S.
- Died: June 21, 2008 (aged 82) Detroit, Michigan, U.S.
- Genres: R&B, gospel
- Occupation: Singer
- Years active: 1951–1967
- Labels: King, Argo, Federal, Tangerine

Lula Reed (born Lula Marietta McClelland, March 21, 1926 – June 21, 2008) was an American rhythm and blues and gospel singer who recorded in the 1950s and 1960s. She had two R&B hits in 1952 as vocalist with pianist and bandleader Sonny Thompson, and later recorded with guitarist Freddy King. She was occasionally credited as Lulu Reed.

== Background ==
Reed was born in Mingo Junction, Jefferson County, Ohio. As a child her family moved to Port Clinton, Ohio, where she sang in her local church choir.

== Career ==
Reed was mentored by blind gospel singer Professor Harold Boggs, before winning an audition over 50 other contestants in Toledo to become the vocalist with Sonny Thompson's band. Credited as vocalist on Thompson's records, she made her recording debut for King Records in Cincinnati in late 1951, on the song "I'll Drown in My Tears" written by Henry Glover. The song reached no. 5 on the Billboard R&B chart in 1952, and was recorded by Ray Charles in 1956 as "Drown in My Own Tears", with wider commercial success.

Reed's next record with Thompson, "Let's Call It A Day", also written by Glover, reached no. 7 on the Billboard R&B chart. Most of her later records for King were credited in her own name, although she continued to record with Thompson, who became her husband in 1954. She was a versatile singer, performing some gospel songs as well as blues and R&B. Her 1954 recording, "Rock Love", was later covered by Little Willie John. She remained popular, being voted no. 4 R&B singer in the Cash Box annual poll in 1954, and continued to record for the King label until 1956. However, Reed failed to have any further chart hits. King released an album of her recordings, Blue And Moody, in 1958.

Reed and Thompson recorded for the Chess Records subsidiary Argo between 1958 and 1960, before returning to Cincinnati and starting to record for King's subsidiary Federal label in 1961. She released seven singles on Federal over the next two years, on many of them accompanied by Freddy King, but none made the charts. Accompanied by King and Thompson, she also released an album on Federal, Boy-Girl-Boy, in 1962. She then moved to the Tangerine label set up by Ray Charles, and recorded a series of singles in the early 1960s. Her final single was released in 1967.

She then left the music business, due to her perceived lack of promotion by the last record company she signed with. She died in Detroit, Michigan in 2008 at the age of 82.

Several compilation albums of her recordings have been issued, including I'll Drown in My Tears – The King Anthology.

== Legacy ==
In Episode 4, Season 1 of Totems (2021), French CIA agent Virgile (José Garcia) listens to Reed in his apartment.
