= Connie Allen =

American singer

Background information
- Born: September 24, 1926
- Died: August 30, 1991 (aged 64)

Constantina "Connie" Allen (September 24, 1926 – August 30, 1991) was an American singer and musician. She recorded the song "Rocket 69" in 1951, backed by Todd Rhodes and His Toddlers (also called the Todd Rhodes Orchestra).

== Other songs ==
In addition to "Rocket 69", Allen also performed several other songs with Todd Rhodes as well as Paul "Hucklebuck" Williams. Some of her songs include; "Your Daddy's Doggin' Around", "Hard Working Woman", "Sugar in my Bowl", "What's Happening", and "You'll Never Change Me".
