= The Midnighters =

American vocal group

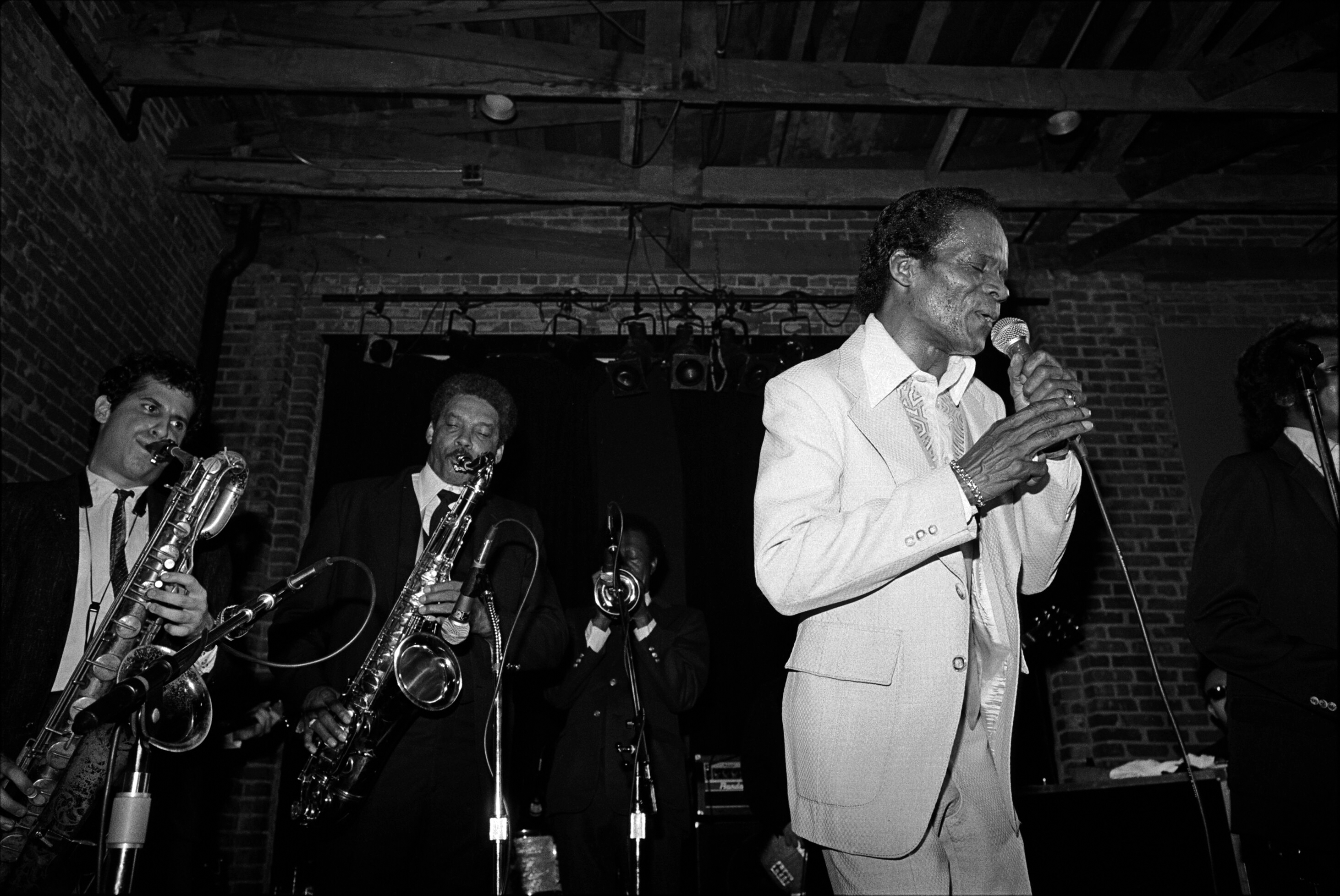
- Hank Ballard and the Midnighters in concert, 1982

Background information
- Also known as: The Four Falcons, The Royals, Hank Ballard & the Midnighters
- Origin: Detroit, Michigan, United States
- Genres: Rock and roll; R&B; doo-wop
- Labels: Federal, King, People
- Past members: J.C. Billy Davis; Alonzo Tucker; Freddy Pride; Hank Ballard; Henry Booth; Charles Sutton; Lawson Smith; Ardra “Sonny” Woods; Norman Thrasher; Arthur Porter; Cal Green; Walter Miller; Frank Stanford; Wesley Hargrove

The Midnighters were an American vocal group from Detroit, Michigan. They were an influential group in the 1950s and early 1960s, with many R&B hit records. They were also notable for launching the career of lead singer Hank Ballard and the worldwide dance craze the twist.

Between 1953 and 1962, the Midnighters had several hits on the U.S. pop and R&B charts. Their hits included the million-selling Billboard top 10 pop hits "Finger Poppin' Time" (for which they received a 1961 Grammy Award nomination), and "Let's Go, Let's Go, Let's Go". The Midnighters also had 13 top 10 R&B hits, including three that reached number 1. Their top 10 R&B hits included "Work with Me, Annie", "It's Love Baby (24 Hours a Day)", "Annie Had a Baby", "The Hoochi Coochi Coo", "Teardrops on Your Letter", "Get It", "The Float" and "Nothing but Good".

They received the Rhythm and Blues Foundation's prestigious Pioneer Award in 1992 and were inducted into the Vocal Group Hall of Fame in 1999. The Midnighters are also noted for achieving a music industry milestone in 1960, by becoming the first group in history to place 3 singles on the Billboard Hot 100 at the same time. The group's lead singer, Hank Ballard, was inducted into the Rock and Roll Hall of Fame in 1990. The Midnighters as a group were inducted into the Rock and Roll Hall of Fame on April 14, 2012.

== The Royals: Origin and early years ==
The group was formed as the Four Falcons by guitarist and songwriter Alonzo Tucker in Detroit in 1952. For their recording debut, their name was changed to the Royals, as there was another Detroit-based group with a similar name, the Falcons. After several personnel changes, the group stabilized with the lineup of Tucker, Henry Booth, Charles Sutton, Sonny Woods, and Lawson Smith. Hank Ballard and Sonny Woods met when they worked on the same Ford auto assembly line in Detroit. They became friends, and when Smith, the group's lead singer, was drafted, Ballard joined the group to take his place. This was the lineup when the group was discovered by the bandleader, songwriter, and record producer Johnny Otis in 1953. Otis became the group's manager and obtained a record contract for them with Cincinnati-based King Records on its subsidiary label De Luxe Records.

Initially, Sutton took over Smith's role as lead singer (usually), while Ballard sang backup with Woods, Booth, and Tucker. Early Royals and Midnighters recordings featuring Sutton were doo-wop ballads, including the original version of "Every Beat of My Heart", written by Otis (which, years later, became the first million-selling hit for Gladys Knight & the Pips), and "Starting from Tonight" (written by Tucker). Ballard began writing for the group and became its lead singer. The group had some success and moved to another King Records subsidiary, Federal Records, for which they recorded "Get It", their first major R&B hit, which spent seven weeks in the top 10 on the R&B chart and also sold well in mainstream markets. Around this time, the group's name was considered too similar to that of another group on the King roster, The "5" Royales, and the name was changed to the Midnighters.

"Get It" was followed by other hits, all of which featured Ballard as lead singer. The first record in this series was "Work with Me, Annie" (1953), a controversial song, which reached number 1 on the Billboard R&B chart and sold over a million copies. The "Annie" song series included "Sexy Ways" (R&B chart number 2, 1954), "Annie Had a Baby" (R&B chart number 1 and a million-seller, 1954), "Annie's Aunt Fannie" (R&B chart number 10 and a million-seller, 1954), and "Henry's Got Flat Feet (Can't Dance No More)" (number 14 R&B, 1955, a response to "(Dance with Me, Henry)", recorded earlier that year by Etta James as an "answer song" to "Work with Me, Annie"). Several of these early Midnighters' hits were banned from airplay by the F.C.C. because of sexual overtones in their lyrics. However, despite this, they received publicity, and crossed over to the white teenage audience, resulting in crossover sales.

== Dry spell, come back, and "The Twist" ==
After one more top 10 R&B hit, "It's Love Baby (24 Hours a Day)", in 1955, the Midnighters had no more hit songs for three and a half years. During this time, members came and went: Lawson Smith returned from the U.S. armed forces after having been drafted, replacing Henry Booth, and Norman Thrasher eventually replaced Sonny Woods. The guitarist Cal Green replaced Arthur Porter, who had earlier taken the place of original member Alonzo Tucker.

Tucker went on to become a successful independent songwriter, writing hits for Jackie Wilson "Baby Workout", "No Pity (In the Naked City)", "Squeeze Her, Tease Her (But Love Her)", "You Don't Know What It Means", "Years from Now", the Chi-Lites "Marriage License", Gladys Knight & the Pips "Every Beat of My Heart" (originally recorded by the Midnighters), the Animals, and others. He also wrote but was not credited with Wilson's hit song "Doggin' Around"; Nat Tarnopol, the president of Wilson's record label, Brunswick Records, placed the name of his as-yet-unborn son Paul Tarnopol on the record as a writer in Tucker's place.

The Midnighters released records during this time, but none were hits. In the meantime, the group's record company, King, had become more interested in a powerful new vocal group from Georgia: the Famous Flames, featuring the singers James Brown and Bobby Byrd, who had been influenced by the Midnighters.

In 1959, the group, now called Hank Ballard & the Midnighters, had been switched to the parent label, King Records, and released their first hit in 4 years, "Teardrops on Your Letter". It was a top 10 hit on the Billboard R&B chart, peaking at number 4 (it also reached number 87 on the Billboard pop chart), and re-established the Midnighters as a hit-making force. Even more significant was the song's flip side, a song about a dance, "The Twist". It was also a hit, reaching number 16 on the R&B chart. It was an even bigger hit for the group when it was re-released a year later.

According to The Twist, by Jim Dawson, Dave Appell, working for Kal Mann and Bernie Lowe's Cameo-Parkway Records of Philadelphia, wanted to record a version of the Midnighters' hit, "The Twist." Although Ballard was credited as the sole writer of the song, its origins allegedly went back further than that. In the summer of 1960, while serving as bandleader of Cameo-Parkway's house band, Appell wanted to re-record the song, as he saw the song as having hit potential. In the meantime, Dick Clark, the host of ABC's American Bandstand, also noticed how local white teens in Philly were dancing to Hank and the Midnighters' original and felt the same as Appell. But, having no literal or financial connection to the Midnighters' record label, King Records, Clark had no way to capitalize on the Midnighters' song. Clark gave promotion and airplay to two of the Midnighters records, "Finger Poppin' Time", and "Let's Go, Let's Go, Let's Go" on American Bandstand in exchange for King Records president Syd Nathan giving Clark licensing rights for one of his artists on Cameo Parkway, one Ernest Evans, later to be known as Chubby Checker, to record "The Twist". Clark was part owner of Cameo-Parkway and several other record companies at the time.

== 2012 Rock and Roll Hall of Fame induction ==
In 2012, the Midnighters as a group were inducted into the Rock and Roll Hall of Fame. A special subcommittee, appointed by the Rock and Roll Hall of Fame, addressed the question of recognizing pioneering groups that had not been inducted in the Hall's early years when their frontmen were inducted. As a result of this committee's decision, the Midnighters were automatically inducted into the Rock and Roll Hall of Fame alongside Hank Ballard, without the normal process of nomination and voting, under the premise that they should have been inducted with Ballard in 1990. The inducted members were Henry Booth, Billy Davis, Cal Green, Arthur Porter, Lawson Smith, Charles Sutton, Norman Thrasher, and Sonny Woods. Original Midnighters Smith (now known as Abdul Bin-Asad) and Thrasher, the last surviving members of the group, accepted the induction on behalf of the group and acknowledged departed members, including the group's founder, Alonzo Tucker, who was not inducted.

In 2015, Hank Ballard & the Midnighters were inducted into the third class of the Rhythm & Blues Music Hall of Fame, in Cleveland.

Hank Ballard & the Midnighters set a music industry milestone in 1960, by becoming the first group in history to place 3 hit singles in the Billboard Hot 100 at the same time: Finger Poppin' Time", "Let's Go, Let's Go, Let's Go" and "The Twist" in mid-July, 1960. The Midnighters held this record until it was finally broken by the Beatles in 1964.

== Awards ==
- Vocal Group Hall of Fame (inducted 1999)
- Rock and Roll Hall of Fame (The Midnighters - inducted 2012)
- Rock and Roll Hall of Fame (Ballard only - 1990)
- Michigan Rock and Roll Legends Hall of Fame
- Rhythm and Blues Music Hall of Fame (Hank Ballard & the Midnighters - inducted 2015)
- Grammy Award nomination "Finger Poppin' Time" (1961)
- Rhythm and Blues Foundation's Pioneer Award (1992)

== Discography ==
All credited to Hank Ballard and the Midnighters unless stated otherwise.

=== Albums ===
- Volume 2 (King Records, 1958)
- Singin' and Swingin' (King Records, 1959)
- The One and Only (King Records, 1960)
- Mr. Rhythm and Blues (King Records, 1960)
- Dance Along (King Records, 1961)
- Spotlight on Hank Ballard (King Records, 1961)
- The Twistin' Fools (King Records, 1962)
- Jumpin' (King Records, 1962)

=== Singles ===
Year	Single	Chart Positions	
Year	Single	US Pop	US R&B
1953	"Get It"; The Royals	—	6
1954	"Work with Me, Annie"; The Midnighters	—	1
1954	"Sexy Ways"; The Midnighters	—	2
1954	"Annie Had a Baby"; The Midnighters	—	1
1954	"Annie's Aunt Fannie"; The Midnighters	—	10
1955	"Henry's Got Flat Feet (Can't Dance No More)"; The Midnighters	—	14
1955	"It's Love Baby (24 Hours a Day)"; The Midnighters	—	10
1959	"Teardrops on Your Letter" / "The Twist"	87 —	4; 16
1959	"Kansas City"	72	16
1960	"The Coffee Grind"	—	21
1960	"Finger Poppin' Time"	7	2
1960	"The Twist" (reissue)	28	6
1960	"Let's Go, Let's Go, Let's Go"	6	1
1961	"The Hoochi Coochi Coo"	23	3
1961	"Let's Go Again (Where We Went Last Night)"	39	17
1961	"The Continental Walk"	33	12
1961	"The Switch-a-Roo" / "The Float"	26; 92	3; 10
1961	"Nothing but Good" / "Keep On Dancing"	49; 66	9 —
1962	"Do You Know How to Twist"	87	—
1968	"How You Gonna Get Respect (When You Haven't Cut Your Process Yet)"; Hank Ballard with the Dapps	—	15
1969	"From the Love Side"; Hank Ballard and the Midnight Lighters	—	43
"—" denotes releases that did not chart.
