= Annie Had a Baby =

Single by The Midnighters
- B-side: "She's the One"
- Released: August 1954
- Genre: Rhythm and blues, Doo-wop
- Length: 2:40
- Label: Federal; 12195
- Songwriters: Henry Glover; Lois Mann

The Midnighters singles chronology
"Sexy Ways" (1954)	"Annie Had a Baby" (1954)	"Annie's Aunt Fannie" (1954)

"Annie Had a Baby" is a 1954 rhythm and blues song, written by Henry Glover and Lois Mann and recorded by The Midnighters. The single was one of many answer songs to "Work with Me, Annie", a previous hit for The Midnighters. Like its predecessor, "Annie Had a Baby" was also a number one hit on the US Billboard R&B chart. A credible inspiration for this song was when a Los Angeles DJ played "Work with Me, Annie", then joked about a follow-up record titled "Annie Had a Baby", which caused King Records to receive orders for the then non-existing single. So the song was composed, recorded and released to fill the orders.

The record sold in excess of one million copies.
