= Drown in My Own Tears =

1951 song by Henry Glover

Single by Ray Charles

from the album Ray Charles (or, Hallelujah I Love Her So)
- B-side: "Mary Ann"
- Released: February 1956
- Recorded: November 30, 1955
- Genre: Soul; R&B
- Length: 3:21
- Label: Atlantic
- Songwriter: Henry Glover
- Producer: Jerry Wexler

Ray Charles singles chronology
| "Blackjack" (1955) | "Drown in My Own Tears" (1956) | "Hallelujah I Love Her So" (1956) |

"Drown in My Own Tears", originally credited as "I'll Drown in My Tears", is a song written by Henry Glover. It is best known in the version released as a single in 1956 by Ray Charles on the Atlantic record label.

== History ==
"Drown in My Own Tears" was first recorded in 1951 by Lula Reed, on the King label (King 4527) as part of a split-single 78 rpm; blues pianist Sonny Thompson was featured on the A-side with the instrumental track, "Clang, Clang, Clang". The record was a No.5 hit on the US Billboard R&B chart.

Ray Charles' recording featured his lead vocal and piano, with instrumentation by session musicians. It was his third number-one single on the Billboard R&B singles chart. It was one of his most important singles during his Atlantic period, where he dominated the R&B singles chart, and influenced him to recruit a singing group he later called the Raelettes.

== Personnel ==
- Ray Charles, arranged and also played piano
- Cecil Payne, baritone saxophone
- Paul West, bass
- David "Panama" Francis, drums
- Donald Wilkerson, tenor saxophone
- Joe Bridgewater, Joshua "Jack" Willis, trumpet
- produced by Ahmet Ertegun and Jerry Wexler

== Other recordings ==
- Jeff Beck and Lulu - Martin Scorsese Presents the Blues: Red, White & Blues (2003)
- Chuck Brown and Eva Cassidy - The Other Side (2003)
- David Clayton-Thomas - Clayton (1978)
- Joe Cocker - Mad Dogs & Englishmen, (1970)
- Mitty Collier - Shades Of A Genius (1965)
- Floyd Cramer - Comin' On (1963)
- Bobby Darin - Bobby Darin Sings Ray Charles (1962)
- Ronnie Earl - Grateful Heart: Blues & Ballads (1996)
- Aretha Franklin - I Never Loved a Man the Way I Love You (1967)
- Jeff Buckley - Live at Sin-é (1993)
- Earl Grant - Spotlight On Earl Grant (1965)
- Richie Havens - The Richie Havens Record (1969)
- Billy Hawks - More Heavy Soul (1968)
- Shirley Horn - Light out of Darkness (A Tribute to Ray Charles) (1993)
- Etta James - Etta, Red-Hot & Live (1982)
- Norah Jones - Ray Genius A Night For Ray Charles (compilation) (2004)
- Janis Joplin - Janis (1975)
- Michael Kaeshammer - No Strings Attached (2000)
- Blood, Sweat & Tears - Nuclear Blues (1980)
- Jack McDuff - On with It! (1961, released 1971)
- Jimmy McGriff - One of Mine (1996)
- Houston Person - Person to Person! (1970)
- Billy Preston - The Most Exciting Organ Ever (1965)
- Saffire - The Uppity Blues Women - Saffire - The Uppity Blues Women (1990)
- Don Shirley - Golden Classics (1997)
- Simply Red - B-side to "Holding Back the Years" (1986)
- Percy Sledge - The Percy Sledge Way (1967)
- Spencer Davis Group - You Put the Hurt On Me (EP) (1965)
- The Derek Trucks Band with Gregg Allman - Soul Serenade (2003)
- Johnnie Taylor - This Is Your Night (1984)
- Dinah Washington - Dinah '63 (1963)
- Charles Williams - Stickball (1972)
- Johnny Winter - Johnny Winter (1969)
- Stevie Wonder - Tribute to Uncle Ray (1962)
- Cornelius Bumpus - "Known Fact" (2000)
- The Teskey Brothers - The Circle Session (2024)

Other recordings include one by Dinah Washington on the 1998 CD reissue of The Swingin' Miss "D" (1957), originally on the EmArcy Records label. The song was also performed by Simply Red in 1991 at the Montreux Jazz Festival, featuring on the live album of the event.

== See also ==
- List of number-one rhythm and blues hits (United States)
