= Cherry Wine (Little Esther song) =

Single by Little Esther
- Released: 1953
- Songwriter(s): Henry Glover

"Cherry Wine" is a 1953 song by Little Esther written by Henry Glover. It is the best known of her releases from Federal Records and has been re-issued several times. Billboard noted her distinctive style and "a lively piano in the backing".
