= It Ain't the Meat (It's the Motion) =

1951 rhythm and blues song

Single by The Swallows
- B-side: "Eternally"
- Released: 1951
- Genre: Rhythm and blues
- Label: King
- Songwriters: Henry Glover and Syd Nathan

"It Ain't the Meat (It's the Motion)", also known as "It Ain't the Meat", is a rhythm and blues song written by Henry Glover and Syd Nathan. It was first recorded in 1951 by the Swallows and released by King Records. It was later covered by Maria Muldaur in a 1974 version that has been credited with popularizing the song's title phrase as a proverb, referring to the importance of a man's sexual technique over the size of his penis.

== Versions ==
=== Original ===
The song was first recorded by the Swallows in April 1951 and released as a single on King Records. In its initial release, the song was a minor hit.

The song has been re-issued on several compilations, including:

- Risque Rhythm (Rhino, 1992), a compilation of classic R&B songs featuring sexually suggestive lyrics.
- Risque Blues: It Ain't the Meat (King, 1996)
- The King R&B Box Set (King, 1996)

=== Covers ===
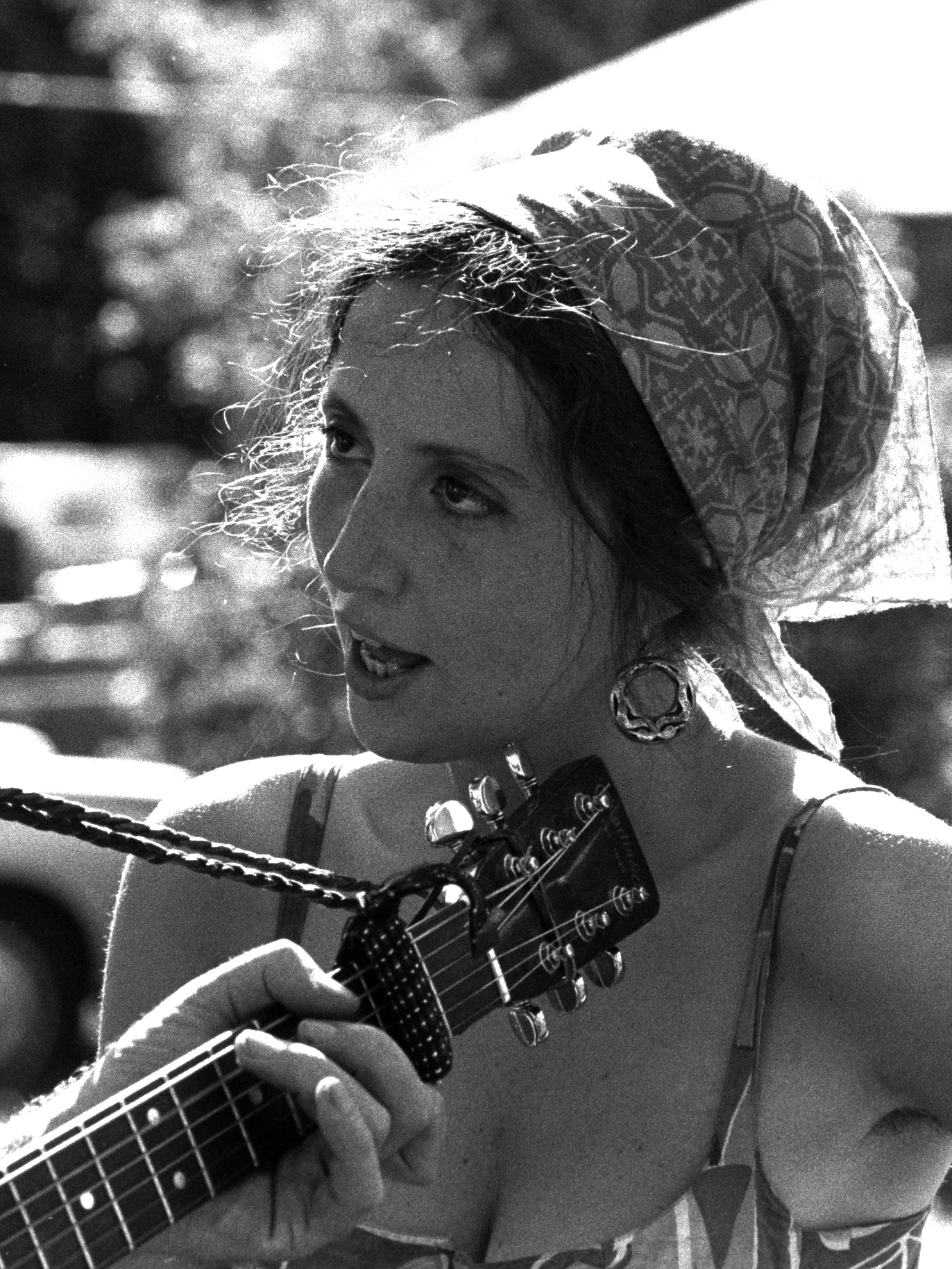
Maria Muldaur

The song has been covered by various artists, including:

- Maria Muldaur on her albums, Waitress in a Donut Shop (1974) and Meet Me Where They Play the Blues (1999)
- Southside Johnny and the Asbury Jukes on their debut album I Don't Want to Go Home (1976)
- Dana Gillespie on her albums, Below the Belt (1984) and Blues It Up (1990)
- King Cotton and Donny Gerrard on the soundtrack to Paul Schrader's Auto Focus (2002)
- Moonshine Reunion (feat. The Baboons) on the album Sex, Trucks & Rock 'N' Roll (2006)
- Yannick Bovy on the album Love Swings (2017)

== Lyrics and double entendre ==
The song, as originally released in 1951, repeats the chorus, "It ain't the meat, it's the motion, Makes your daddy wanna rock." The song begins by describing a skinny girl: "Now I had a girl so doggone thin, No meat, no bones, she was just all skin." It then moves on to a heavier girl: "You find some girls who are big and fat, Some fellows don't like to see them like that, But I like to see 'em big and tall, The bigger they come, the harder they fall."

Although the original version of the song by The Swallows referred to the "meat" on a woman, the song's title has developed into a common phrase used to refer to the importance of a man's sexual technique over the size of the penis. In 2012, The Dictionary of Modern Proverbs noted that the phrase had "entered the oral tradition as a proverb." The authors credited a 1974 rendition of the song by Maria Muldaur with popularizing the phrase as a slang reference to the penis. In 1964, James Baldwin referred to the phrase as "a very rude expression" for the fact that "if you do know how to make love, or if you are in love with somebody, the size of your member doesn't matter."

In 2014, Salon rated "It Ain't the Meat" as one of the 19 greatest double entendre songs of all time.
