= Big Ten Inch Record =

1952 rhythm and blues song

Single by Bull Moose Jackson
- B-side: "I Needed You"
- Released: 1952
- Genre: Rhythm and blues, dirty blues
- Label: King
- Songwriter: Fred Weismantel

"Big Ten Inch Record", also known as "Big Ten-Inch (Record of the Blues)", is a rhythm and blues song written by Fred Weismantel. It was first recorded in 1952 by Bull Moose Jackson and released by King Records, originally on 10" 78, the most popular format at the time. The song was later covered by Aerosmith and released as part of the 1975 album, Toys in the Attic. It has been rated as one of the best double entendre songs of all time.

== Versions ==
=== Bull Moose Jackson ===
The original version of the song was performed by Bull Moose Jackson. It was released in 1952 on King Records as disc 4580. Jackson was backed on the recording by Tiny Bradshaw's Orchestra. The song was not a hit, reportedly due to the fact that it was "too suggestive" and "radio stations wouldn't touch it".

Jackson stopped performing in the 1960s and worked as a food service worker in Washington, D.C. In the 1980s, his popularity was revived after a Pennsylvania band, The Flashcats, began playing "Big Ten Inch Record" at their shows and invited Jackson to perform with them.

Jackson's version of the song has been re-issued on multiple compilation discs, including Badman Jackson That's Me (1991), Ride, Daddy, Ride and Other Songs of Love (1991), Risque Blues: The King Anthology (2002), The Very Best of Bull Moose Jackson: Big Ten-Inch Record (2004), and The Bull Moose Jackson Collection 1945–55 (2013).

=== Aerosmith ===
The rock band Aerosmith covered the song on its 1975 album, Toys in the Attic. The recording was Aerosmith's second cover of rhythm and blues songs from the early 1950s, having covered "Train Kept A-Rollin'" on its 1974 album, Get Your Wings. They also covered an r&b hit from 1963, "Walking the Dog" by Rufus Thomas on their eponymous debut in 1973.

The song received mixed reviews. One critic predicted that it would be "the only Aerosmith song hoary historians and earnest teen-agers will be playing 100 years from now." On the other hand, Mark Simmons of The Austin American-Statesman called it "low humor" and opined that "the double entendre 'Big Ten Inch' goes deservedly limp."

While it was omitted from Greatest Hits in 1980, the song has since been re-issued on multiple Aerosmith compilations, including Pandora's Box (1991), Aerosmith's Greatest Hits 1973–1988 (2001), O, Yeah! Ultimate Aerosmith Hits (2002), and The Essential Aerosmith (2011).

=== Additional covers ===
In addition to Aerosmith, the song has also been covered by other artists, including Sugar Blue and Marshall Crenshaw, Al Copley, Blerta, The Roadrunners, Dana Gillespie, and Candye Kane.

== Lyrics and double entendre ==
On its face, the song describes the reaction of the singer's girlfriend when he plays his latest ten-inch record. However, by the repeated use of a pregnant pause prior to the word "record", the song suggests that the woman is excited not by the record but by the narrator's penis. The following passage is typical:

Got me the strangest woman
Believe it, this chick's no cinch
But I really get her goin'
When I take out my Big Ten Inch
Record of the band that plays the blues

In The History of Rock & Roll, Ed Ward called the song "a masterpiece of double entendre and timing". Although the song's lyrics are written in the form of an "extended sexual metaphor", they have been cited as part of a trend toward more "open sexuality" in rhythm and blues music of the early 1950s.

In 2014, Salon rated Aerosmith's "Big Ten Inch Record'" as one of the 19 greatest double entendre songs of all time.
