= Wynonie Harris =

American blues singer (1915–1969)

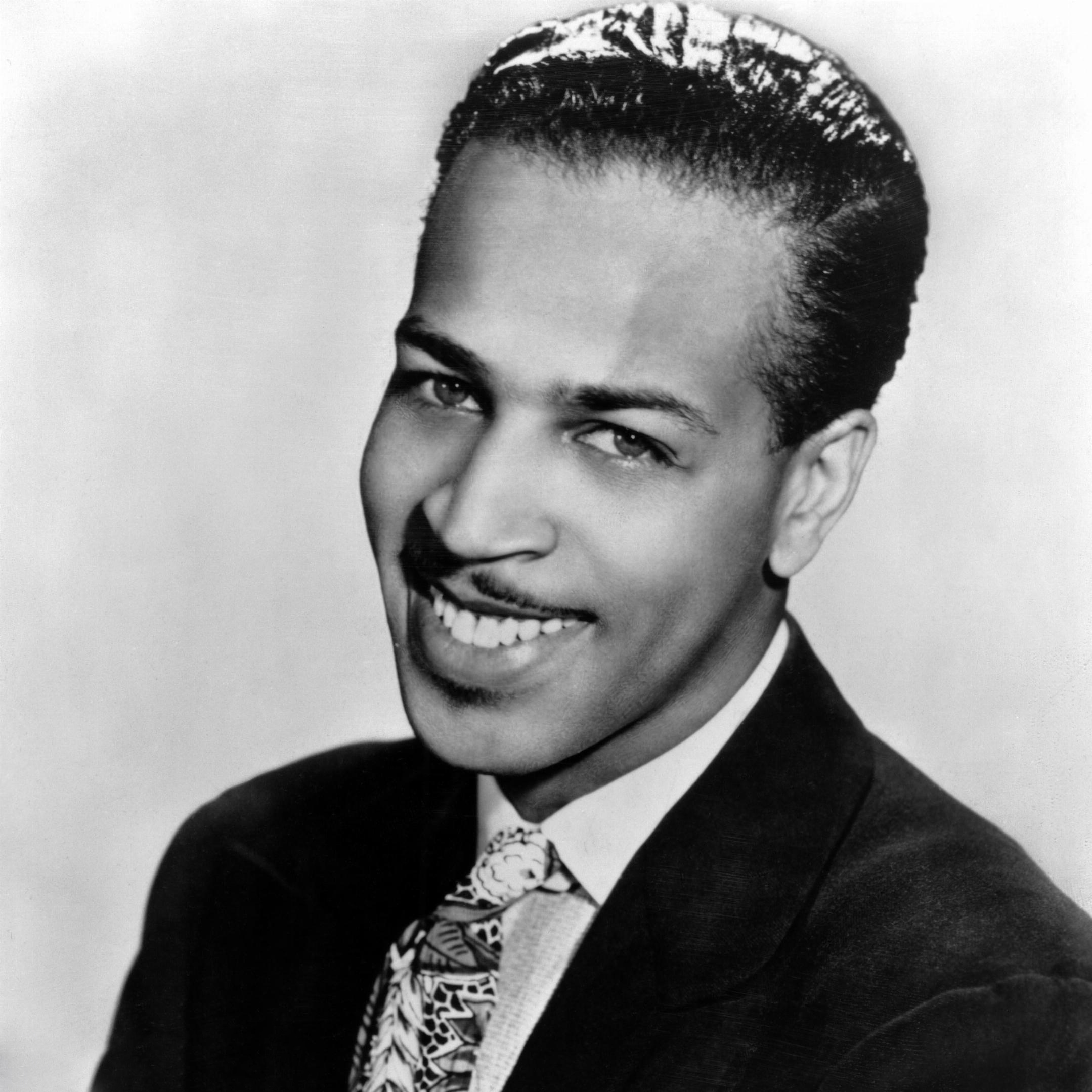
- Publicity photo of Harris

Background information
- Born: August 24, 1915; Omaha, Nebraska, U.S.
- Died: June 14, 1969 (aged 53) Los Angeles, California, U.S.
- Genres: Swing; jump blues; R&B; rock and roll
- Occupation: Singer
- Years active: 1935–1969

Wynonie Harris (August 24, 1915 – June 14, 1969) was an American blues shouter best remembered as a singer of upbeat songs, featuring humorous, often ribald lyrics. He had fifteen Top 10 hits between 1946 and 1952. Harris is often seen as an important influence on early rock and roll, particularly his 1947 single "Good Rocking Tonight” which has been identified as arguably the first rock and roll song.

His dirty blues repertoire included "Lolly Pop Mama" (1948), "I Like My Baby's Pudding" (1950), "Sittin' on It All the Time" (1950), "Keep On Churnin' (Till the Butter Comes)" (1952), and "Wasn't That Good" (1953).

== Biography ==
=== Early life and family ===
Harris's mother, Mallie Hood Anderson, was fifteen and unmarried at the time of his birth. His paternity is uncertain. His wife, Olive E. Goodlow, and daughter, Patricia Vest, said that his father was a Native American named Blue Jay. Wynonie had no father figure in his family until 1920, when his mother married Luther Harris, fifteen years her senior.

In 1931, at age 16, Harris dropped out of high school in North Omaha. The following year, his first child, a daughter, Micky, was born to Naomi Henderson. Ten months later his son, Wesley, was born to Laura Devereaux. Both children were raised by their mothers. Wesley became a singer in the Five Echoes and in The Sultans, and later was a singer and guitarist in Preston Love's band.

In 1935 Harris, age 20, started dating 16-year-old Olive E. (Ollie) Goodlow, of Council Bluffs, Iowa, who came to neighboring Omaha to watch him perform. On May 20, 1936, Ollie gave birth to a daughter, Adrianne Patricia (Pattie). Harris and Ollie were married on December 11, 1936. Later they lived in the Logan Fontenelle Housing Project in North Omaha. Ollie worked as a barmaid and nurse; Harris sang in clubs and took odd jobs. His mother was Pattie's main caretaker. In 1940, Wynonie and Ollie Harris moved to Los Angeles, California, leaving Pattie with her grandmother in Omaha.

== Early career ==
Harris formed a dance team with Velda Shannon in the early 1930s. They performed in North Omaha's flourishing entertainment community, and by 1934, were a regular attraction at the Ritz Theatre. In 1935, Harris, having become a celebrity in Omaha, was able to earn a living as an entertainer, in the depths of the Great Depression.

While performing at Jim Bell's Club Harlem nightclub with Shannon, he began to sing the blues. He began traveling frequently to Kansas City, where he paid close attention to blues shouters, including Jimmy Rushing and Big Joe Turner. His break in Los Angeles was at a nightclub owned by Curtis Mosby. It was here that Harris became known as "Mr. Blues".

== With Lucky Millinder ==
During the 1942–44 musicians' strike, Harris was unable to pursue a recording career, relying instead on personal appearances. Performing almost continuously, in late 1943 he appeared at the Rhumboogie Club in Chicago. He was spotted by Lucky Millinder, who asked him to join his band on tour. Harris joined on March 24, 1944, when the band was in the middle of a week-long residency at the Regal in Chicago.

They moved on to New York City, where on April 7 Harris took the stage with Millinder's band for his debut at the Apollo Theatre, in Harlem. It was during this performance that Harris first publicly performed "Who Threw the Whiskey in the Well" (a song recorded two years earlier by Doc Wheeler's Sunset Orchestra).

After the band's stint at the Apollo, they moved on to their regular residency at the Savoy Ballroom, also in Harlem. Here, Preston Love, Harris's childhood friend, joined Millinder's band, replacing the alto saxophonist Tab Smith. On May 26, 1944, Harris made his recording debut with Lucky Millinder and His Orchestra. Entering a recording studio for the first time, Harris sang on two of the five cuts recorded that day, "Hurry, Hurry" and "Who Threw the Whiskey in the Well", for Decca Records. The embargo on shellac during World War II had not yet been rescinded, and release of the record was delayed.

Harris's success and popularity grew as Millinder's band toured the country, but he and Millinder had a falling out over money, and in September 1945, while playing in San Antonio, Texas, Harris quit the band. Three weeks later, upon hearing of Harris's separation from the band, a Houston promoter refused to allow Millinder's band to perform. Millinder called Harris and agreed to pay his asking price of one hundred dollars a night. The promoter reinstated the booking, but it was the final time Harris and Millinder worked together. Bull Moose Jackson replaced Harris as the vocalist in the band.

In April 1945, a year after the song was recorded, Decca released "Who Threw the Whiskey in the Well". It became the group's biggest hit, reaching number one on the Billboard R&B chart on July 14 and staying there for eight weeks. The song remained on the charts for almost five months, also becoming popular with white audiences.

In California the success of the song opened doors for Harris. Since the contract with Decca was with Millinder, Harris was a free agent and could choose from the recording contracts with which he was presented.

== Solo career ==
In July 1945, Harris signed with Philo, a label owned by the brothers Leo and Edward Mesner. Harris' band was assembled by Johnny Otis, and the group recorded the 78-rpm record "Around the Clock". Although not a chart-topper, the song became popular, and cover versions were recorded by many artists, including Willie Bryant, Jimmy Rushing and Big Joe Turner.

Harris went on to record sessions for other labels, including Apollo, Bullet and Aladdin. His greatest success came when he signed for Syd Nathan's King label, where he enjoyed a series of hits on the U.S. R&B chart in the late 1940s and early 1950s. These included a 1948 cover of Roy Brown's "Good Rocking Tonight", "Good Morning Judge" and "All She Wants to Do Is Rock". In 1946, Harris recorded two singles with the pianist Herman "Sonny" Blount, who later earned fame as the eclectic jazz composer and bandleader Sun Ra.

Some reviewers state that "Good Rocking Tonight", by Roy Brown (1947) or by Harris (1948) is one of the contenders for the title of "first rock'n'roll record". The label of the 45 RPM record by Brown included the words "Rocking blues". According to the Paul McCartney Project, "Harris's version was even more energetic than Brown's original version, featuring black gospel style handclapping". The Project adds that "the song has also been credited with being the most successful record to that point to use the word 'rock' not as a euphemism for sex, but as a descriptive for the musical style.

In 1950, Harris released the double-sided hit "Sittin' on It All the Time" backed with "Baby, Shame on You" (King 4330), and in 1951, he recorded a cover version of Hank Penny's "Bloodshot Eyes" (King 4461). His risqué approach to material at times made his tracks "Keep On Churnin'" (1952) and "Wasn't That Good" (1953) jukebox favorites in the early 1950s. Other lascivious songs he recorded include the earlier tracks "I Want My Fanny Brown" and "Lollipop Mama".

Harris had "16 Top 10 R&B hits between 1945 and 1952, including the definitive version of Roy Brown's "Good Rockin' Tonight," a disc that spent 25 weeks on Billboard's chart in 1948".

"Lovin' Machine", (1952), and "The Deacon Don't Like It", (1953), both mentioned Hadacol whiskey.

== Later career ==
Harris transitioned between several recording contracts between 1954 and 1964. In 1960 he cut six sides for Roulette Records, including a remake of his hit "Bloodshot Eyes" and "Sweet Lucy Brown", "Spread the News", "Saturday Night", "Josephine" and "Did You Get the Message". He also became more indebted and was forced to live in less glamorous surroundings.

In 1964 Harris resettled for the last time in Los Angeles. His final recordings were three sides for Chess Records in 1964: "The Comeback", "Buzzard Luck" and "Conjured". His final large-scale performance was at the Apollo in November 1967, where he performed with Big Joe Turner, Big Mama Thornton, Jimmy Witherspoon and T-Bone Walker.

== Death ==
Harris died of esophageal cancer on June 14, 1969, aged 53, at the USC Medical Center Hospital in Los Angeles.

== Legacy ==
He was the subject of a 1994 biography by Tony Collins.

Since the end of the twentieth century, there has been a resurgence of interest in his music. Some of his recordings are being reissued, and he has been honored posthumously.

- 1994: Inducted into the Blues Hall of Fame by the Blues Foundation in Memphis, Tennessee
- 1998: Inducted into the Nebraska Rock and Roll Hall of Fame in Lincoln
- 2000: Inducted into the High School Hall of Fame at Central High School in Omaha, Nebraska
- 2005: Inducted into the Omaha Black Music Hall of Fame

In 2011, Harris's song "Quiet Whiskey" was number 9 on the list of 'Top 10 Drinking Songs' published by AskMen.com.

In 2014, Harris's song "Grandma Plays the Numbers" was featured in the video game Fallout 4.

The Blues Hall of Fame provides these comments: "Harris recorded sporadically afterwards [after 1952] but never again enjoyed the glory or success he'd known as one of the kings of jump blues. Today he is most acknowledged for laying the groundwork for rock 'n' roll".

=== Influence on Elvis Presley ===
Elvis Presley may well have seen Harris perform in Memphis in the early 1950s, although this is not documented. According to Henry Glover, Harris's record producer, Presley "copied many of the vocal gymnastics of Wynonie as well as the physical gyrations. When you saw Elvis, you were seeing a mild version of Wynonie". Harris remarked in a 1956 interview that Presley's hip movements were stirring controversy in a way his own never did: "Many people have been giving him trouble for swinging his hips. I swing mine and have no trouble. He's got publicity I could not buy".

In the television miniseries of 2005, Elvis, Harris was played by Marcus Lyle Brown.

== Discography ==
=== Charting singles ===
Release date	Title	Chart positions		Notes
Release date	Title	US R&B/Race charts	US pop chart	Notes
1944	"Hurry Hurry!"		24	With Lucky Millinder and His Orchestra
1945	"Who Threw the Whiskey in the Well"	1	7	With Lucky Millinder and His Orchestra
1946	"Wynonie's Blues"	3		With Illinois Jacquet and His All-Stars
1946	"Playful Baby"	2		With Johnnie Alston and His All-Stars
1948	"Good Rocking Tonight"	1		Written by Roy Brown, covered by Elvis Presley in 1954
1948	"Lollipop Mama"	8		
1949	"Grandma Plays the Numbers"	7		
1949	"I Feel That Old Age Coming On"	10		
1949	"Drinkin' Wine Spo-Dee-O-Dee"	4		
1949	"All She Wants to Do Is Rock"	1		
1949	"I Want My Fanny Brown"	10		
1950	"Sittin' on It All the Time"	3		
1950	"I Like My Baby's Pudding"	5		
1950	"Good Morning Judge"	6		
1950	"Oh Babe!"	7		With Lucky Millinder and His Orchestra
1951	"Bloodshot Eyes"	6		
1952	"Lovin' Machine"	5		With Todd Rhodes and His Orchestra Hadacol Whiskey mentioned.
