= Todd Rhodes =

American songwriter

Background information
- Born: Todd Washington Rhodes; August 31, 1899; Hopkinsville, Kentucky, United States
- Died: June 4, 1965 (aged 65) Inkster, Michigan
- Genres: Jazz, R&B
- Occupations: Musician, arranger, bandleader
- Instrument: Piano
- Years active: 1921–c.1960
- Formerly of: McKinney's Cotton Pickers

Todd Washington Rhodes (August 31, 1899 or 1900 – June 4, 1965) was an American pianist, bandleader and arranger who was an early influence in jazz and later in R&B.

== Biography ==
Rhodes was born in Hopkinsville, Kentucky, and was raised in Springfield, Ohio. He attended the Springfield School of Music and the Erie Conservatory, studying as pianist and songwriter. After graduating in 1921, he began performing with drummer Bill McKinney in the jazz band McKinney's Cotton Pickers, and played with Benny Carter, Coleman Hawkins, Fats Waller, Rex Stewart, Doc Cheatham, and Don Redman.

He left McKinney's Cotton Pickers in 1934, and lived and played in Detroit from then on. He formed his own small group in 1943, expanding it into the Todd Rhodes Orchestra by 1946. The orchestra made its first recordings for Sensation Records in 1947. Turning more towards rhythm and blues music, the band became known as Todd Rhodes & His Toddlers, and their recordings were distributed by the Vitacoustic label. His instrumental "Blues for the Red Boy" reached number 4 on the R&B chart late in 1948, and the following year "Pot Likker", made number 3 on the R&B chart. "Blues for the Red Boy" was later famously used by Alan Freed as the theme song for his Moondog radio show; Freed referring to the song as "Blues for the Moondog" instead of its actual title.

With his Toddlers, Rhodes also recorded "Your Daddy's Doggin' Around" and "Your Mouth Got a Hole in It". After signing with King Records in 1951, he also worked with Hank Ballard, Dave Bartholomew, and Wynonie Harris. He featured singers such as Connie Allen, who recorded "Rocket 69" in 1952. After she left the band in early 1952, her position was taken by LaVern Baker. Rhodes made his last recordings in the late 1950s.

Rhodes developed diabetes, which was untreated for several years. He died in Inkster, Michigan, in 1965, aged 64 or 65, following the amputation of a leg.
