= Lucky Millinder =

American bandleader (1910–1966)

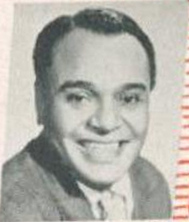
- Millider, Billboard 1944 Music Yearbook

Background information
- Also known as: Lucius Venable Millinder
- Born: Lucius Venables; August 8, 1910; Anniston, Alabama, U.S.
- Died: September 28, 1966 (aged 56) Harlem, New York, U.S.
- Genres: R&B; jump blues; swing
- Occupations: Musician; bandleader
- Years active: 1925–1955
- Labels: Decca; RCA Victor; King

Lucius Venable "Lucky" Millinder (August 8, 1910 – September 28, 1966) was an American swing and rhythm-and-blues bandleader. Although he could not read or write music, did not play an instrument, and rarely sang, his showmanship and musical taste made his bands successful. His group was said to have been the greatest big band to play rhythm and blues, and it gave work to a number of musicians who later became influential at the dawn of the rock and roll era. He was inducted into the Alabama Jazz Hall of Fame in 1986.

== Early career ==
Millinder was born Lucius Venables in Anniston, Alabama, United States. He took the surname Millinder as a child and was raised in Chicago. In the 1920s, he worked in clubs, ballrooms, and theatres in Chicago as a master of ceremonies and dancer. He first fronted a band in 1931 for an RKO theater tour, and in 1932, took over the leadership of Doc Crawford's orchestra in Harlem. He also freelanced elsewhere.

In 1933, he took a band to Europe, playing residencies in Monte Carlo and Paris. He returned to New York to take over the leadership of the Mills Blue Rhythm Band in 1934, which included members Henry "Red" Allen, Charlie Shavers, Harry "Sweets" Edison, and J. C. Higginbotham, and which had a regular slot at the Cotton Club.

== With his own orchestra ==
In 1938, he teamed up with pianist Bill Doggett to front Doggett's group. By 1940, Millinder had formed a completely new orchestra, which included Doggett and the drummer Panama Francis. Around this time, he discovered the established gospel singer and guitarist Rosetta Tharpe, with whom his ensembles performed for many years, and first recorded with on four cuts for Decca Records in 1938.

He established a residency at New York's Savoy Ballroom and won a contract with Decca. Dizzy Gillespie was the band's trumpeter for a while and was featured on Millinder's first charting hit, "When the Lights Go On Again (All Over the World)", which reached number 1 on the U.S. Billboard R&B chart and number 14 on the pop chart in 1942. The follow-up records "Apollo Jump" and "Sweet Slumber" were also big hits, with vocals by Trevor Bacon.

By the mid-1940s, the band was drifting towards what came to be known as rhythm and blues. Other band members around this time included the saxophonists Bull Moose Jackson, Tab Smith, and Eddie "Lockjaw" Davis, and the pianist Sir Charles Thompson. In 1944, Millinder recruited the singer Wynonie Harris, and their recording of "Who Threw the Whiskey in the Well" became the group's biggest hit in 1945, staying at number 1 on the R&B chart for eight weeks and also reaching number 7 on the U.S. pop chart. After Harris left for a solo career, Millinder followed up with another hit, "Shorty's Got to Go", on which he took lead vocals. Soon afterwards, Ruth Brown became the band's singer for a short period before her own solo career took off.

Towards the end of World War II and into the post-war period, the economic situation for touring ensembles (including gas-rationing and entertainment taxes) began to favor smaller bands (such as Louis Jordan's) and limited the number of appearances orchestras such as Millinder's could command. In the late 1940s, the band toured all the larger R&B auditoriums, although it had few chart hits for several years.

In 1949, the band left Decca Records and joined RCA Victor and then King Records, recording with the singers Big John Greer and Annisteen Allen. The band's last big hit was "I'm Waiting Just for You", with Allen, in 1951, which reached number 2 on the R&B chart and number 19 on the pop chart. A year earlier, Millinder's track "Silent George" had become a dirty blues hit.

== Later years ==
By 1952, Millinder began working as a radio DJ. He continued touring with his band, but his style was falling out of favor, and the band's history of many personnel changes began to affect its sound. In 1954, he took over the leadership of the house band at the Apollo Theater for a while. He effectively retired from performing around 1955, although his final recordings were in 1960.

He became active in music publishing and in public relations for a whiskey distillery. He died of a liver ailment in New York City in September 1966.

== Selected discography ==
=== LP compilations ===
- Lucky Millinder / Cab Calloway – Awful Natural (1949) (RCA/PM 42030, 1977)
- Lucky Days 1941–1945 (MCA 1319, 1980)
- Let It Roll (MCA 1357, 1982)
- Shorty's Got to Go (Jukebox Lil 609, 1984)
- Let It Roll Again (Jukebox Lil 613, 1986)
- Lucky Millinder & His Orchestra, Sister Rosetta Tharpe – The Uncollected Lucky Millinder, 1942 (Hindsight Records HSR-233, 1986)

=== CD compilations ===
Every recording (all Decca, RCA Victor, and King) by Lucky Millinder & His Orchestra is included in this four-volume series from the Classics reissue label.

- The Chronological Lucky Millinder & His Orchestra 1941–1942 (Classics 712, 1993)
- The Chronological Lucky Millinder & His Orchestra 1943–1947 (Classics 1026, 1998)
- The Chronological Lucky Millinder & His Orchestra 1947–1950 (Classics 1173, 2001)
- The Chronological Lucky Millinder & His Orchestra 1951–1960 (Classics 1460, 2008)
- Apollo Jump (Proper PVCD-115, 2002)[2-CD set]
- Jukebox Hits 1942–1951 (Acrobat ACMCD-4029, 2005)
- The Very Best of Lucky Millinder (Collectables COL-2898, 2005) – all King recordings

== Preservation ==
Performances of Lucky Millinder & His Orchestra were preserved and restored by the UCLA Film & Television Archive from 16mm prints. Restoration funding was provided by a grant from the Grammy Museum. The restoration had its world premiere at the 2024 UCLA Festival of Preservation.
