= Let's Go, Let's Go, Let's Go =

Single by Hank Ballard and The Midnighters

Single by Hank Ballard and The Midnighters
- B-side: "If You'd Forgive Me"
- Released: September 1960
- Genre: R&B, pop
- Length: 2:19
- Label: King
- Songwriter: Hank Ballard

Hank Ballard and The Midnighters singles chronology
"Finger Poppin' Time" (1960)	"Let's Go, Let's Go, Let's Go" (1960)	"The Hoochi Coochi Coo" (1960)

"Let's Go, Let's Go, Let's Go" (also known as "There's a Thrill on The Hill") is a 1960 pop and R&B single written by Hank Ballard and performed by Hank Ballard and The Midnighters.

== Original version ==
=== Chart performance ===
The single was the last of the Midnighters' three number one singles on the US Billboard R&B chart, staying there for three non-consecutive weeks. "Let's Go, Let's Go, Let's Go" is also Ballard & the Midnighters' most successful pop single, peaking at number six on the Billboard Hot 100. The record sold in excess of one million copies. In Canada the song reached number 16.

== The Chambers Brothers version ==
"Lets Go, Lets Go, Lets Go"

Single by The Chambers Brothers

from the album Unbonded
- A-side: "Lets Go, Lets Go, Lets Go"
- B-side: "Do You Believe in Magic"
- Released: February 1974
- Length: 3:00
- Label: Avco AV-4632
- Composer: Hank Ballard
- Producer: Jimmy Ienner

The Chambers Brothers singles chronology
"Boogie Children" (1973)	"Lets Go, Lets Go, Lets Go" (1974)	"1-2-3" (1974)

The Chambers Brothers recorded their version of the song with Willie Chambers on lead. It was produced by Jimmy Ienner, and released on the Avco label in 1973.

=== Reception ===
"Lets Go, Let's Go, Let's Go" was one of the Picks of the Week in the 23 February issue of Cash Box. The review was positive and with the success that producer Jimmy Ienner had in the past, it was predicted that the pop and r&b markets would jump on the song straight away.

=== Chart performance ===
==== Billboard ====
Their version debuted in the Billboard Hot Soul Singles chart at no. 94 for the week of 30 March 1974. For the week of 27 April, and at its fifth charting week, "Let's Go, Let's Go, Let's Go" peaked at no. 76 in the Billboard Hot Soul Singles chart. It stayed on the chart for one more week.

==== Cash Box ====
"Let's Go, Let's Go, Let's Go" debuted at No. 116 in the Cash Box Looking Ahead chart for the week of 30 February. The following week it was at its final position of No. 119.

For the week of 23 March, the single debuted at No. 70 in the Cash Box R&B Top 70 chart. The record peaked at No. 57 for the week of 13 April.

== See also ==
- List of number-one R&B singles of 1960 (U.S.)
