= Work with Me, Annie =

1954 song by Hank Ballard

Single by Hank Ballard
- B-side: "Until I Die"
- Released: April 1954
- Genre: Rock and roll; R&B
- Length: 2:45
- Label: Federal
- Songwriter: Hank Ballard

Hank Ballard singles chronology
"That's It" (1953)	"Work with Me, Annie" (1954)	"Sexy Ways" (1954)

"Work with Me, Annie" is a 12-bar blues song with words and music by Hank Ballard. It was recorded by Hank Ballard & the Midnighters (formerly The Royals) in Cincinnati on the Federal Records label on January 14, 1954, and released the following month. The Federal Communications Commission (FCC) immediately opposed it due to its overtly sexual lyrics, lyrics that had crossed over and were now being listened to by a white teenage audience. Because the record was in such demand and received so much publicity, attempts to restrict it failed and the record shot to number one in the US Billboard R&B chart, and remained there for seven weeks.

This was the first of the "Annie" records and sold a million copies; so did the answer song "Annie Had a Baby". They all were banned for radio play by the FCC. The success of these recordings spurred the practice of recording double entendre records and answer songs. Another answer, "The Wallflower", by Etta James, popularly known as "Roll with Me, Henry", was reworded by Georgia Gibbs as "Dance with Me, Henry" for Top 40 consumption. It had the same melody as "Work with Me, Annie". The melody was recycled again by the Midnighters for the song "Henry's Got Flat Feet (Can't Dance No More)".

The song "Work with Me, Annie" is part of the Rock and Roll Hall of Fame's "The Songs That Shaped Rock and Roll" list.

== The song ==
Hank Ballard had been a fan of "Sixty Minute Man" recorded by The Dominoes, a song so explicitly sexual that only a rhythm and blues label would take it. When he got the chance he wrote his own bawdy tune. With its strong melody and distinctive rhythm, the song's structure anticipated the style of rock and roll and was flexible enough that later it could be used with entirely different words. The "Annie" lyrics were extremely sexually explicit for the period:

"Annie, please don't cheat. Give me all my meat."

And the punchline:

"Let's get it while the getting is good."

Hank Ballard's baritone and excited squeals backed by the group's 'ah-oom' were accompanied by a boogie piano, a driving electric guitar and a booming electric bass. "Work With Me, Annie" defined what was to become rock and roll.

== See also ==
- List of number-one rhythm and blues hits (United States)
