= The Swallows =

American R&B group

- Also known as: The Oakaleers
- Origin: Baltimore, Maryland, United States
- Genres: R&B
- Years active: 1946–Present
- Members: Eddie Rich; Til George; Bryant Robinson; Leroy Miller; Johnny Robinson
- Past members: Lawrence Coxson; Irving Turner; Earl Hurley; Norris Mack; Frederick Johnson; Herman Denby

The Swallows were an American R&B group. They are best known for their 1951 recording of "Will You Be Mine", which appeared in the US Billboard R&B chart.

== History ==
Founded in Baltimore, Maryland, United States, in 1946 as "The Oakaleers", the original members were Lawrence Coxson (lead tenor), Irving Turner (tenor and baritone), Earl Hurley (first and second tenor and bongos) and Norris "Bunky" Mack (bass, piano, guitar, and drums). The 'Oakaleers' practised on street corners until around 1948, when they joined with Eddie Rich (first tenor) and Frederick “Money Guitar” Johnson (baritone and guitar). Second tenor and baritone Herman "Junior" Denby was hired later. Irving Turner stopped singing with the group, but was kept on as valet (and occasional fill-in).

The Swallows' recording of "Will You Be Mine" was released in 1951, and was one of the first doo-wop hits. "Will You Be Mine" reached a peak position of Number 9 on the US Billboard R&B chart. In 1952, the Swallows released "Beside You", which became their second national hit, peaking at Number 10 on the Billboard R&B chart. More single releases failed to reach these successes, however "It Ain't the Meat (It's the Motion)," the raunchy B-side of their third single, was a big seller in Georgia and the Carolinas. Eddie Rich noted of the song, "[Although] everybody liked it everywhere… you couldn't play it. The[y] blackballed us on that." By 1953, their style was sounding dated and was being usurped by newer arrivals such as The Drifters and The Clovers. They left their original label, King Records and recorded for the After Hours label in 1954. Personnel changes followed, but when their recording of "Itchy Twitchy Feeling" was out-muscled by the Bobby Hendricks' version, the group disbanded.

Herman "Junior" Denby died on July 14, 2013, in West Chester Township, Butler County, Ohio, from pneumonia and Alzheimer's disease. He was aged 82.

== Other sources ==
- Schaaf, Elizabeth. "The Storm Is Passing Over". Peabody Institute.
- "Biography". The Swallows. Doo Wop Hall of Fame. Archived from the original on March 19, 2008.
