= Finger Poppin' Time =

Single by Hank Ballard & the Midnighters

from the album Mr. Rhythm and Blues
- B-side: "I Love You, I Love You So-O-O"
- Released: April 1960
- Genre: R&B
- Length: 2:30
- Label: King
- Songwriter: Hank Ballard

Hank Ballard & the Midnighters singles chronology
| "The Coffee Grind" (1960) | "Finger Poppin' Time" (1960) | "Let's Go, Let's Go, Let's Go" (1960) |

"Finger Poppin' Time" is a song by Hank Ballard and the Midnighters. Written by Ballard, it reached number two on the US Billboard R&B chart and number seven on the pop chart in 1960. It was featured on their 1960 album Mr. Rhythm and Blues. Ballard re-released a version of the song in 1972 as a single, but it did not chart. In Canada it reached number 5.

The song was nominated for the Grammy Award for Best R&B Performance in 1960, losing to "Let the Good Times Roll" by Ray Charles.

The song ranked number 49 on Billboard magazine's Top 100 singles of 1960. The record sold in excess of one million copies.

== Other versions ==
- The Stanley Brothers released a version of the song as a single in 1960, but it did not chart.
- Hello People featuring Utopia released a version of the song on their 1974 album The Handsome Devils.
- Lou Ann Barton featuring The Flemtones released a version of the song on her 1982 album Old Enough.

== In popular culture ==
- The song was mentioned in the 1974 song "Life Is a Rock (But the Radio Rolled Me)" by Reunion.
- Ballard's version was featured in the 1984 film The Flamingo Kid.
- The song was also heard in the 1993 film The Sandlot.
