= Bull Moose Jackson =

American blues and R&B singer and saxophonist (1919–1989)

Background information
- Also known as: Benjamin Clarence Jackson, Jr.
- Born: Benjamin Joseph Jackson; April 22, 1919; Cleveland, Ohio, United States
- Died: July 31, 1989 (aged 70) Cleveland, Ohio, United States
- Genres: Jump blues, dirty blues, R&B
- Occupations: Singer, saxophonist
- Instruments: Vocals, saxophone
- Years active: 1943–89

Benjamin Clarence "Bull Moose" Jackson (April 22, 1919 – July 31, 1989) was an American blues and rhythm-and-blues singer and saxophonist, who was most successful in the late 1940s. He is considered a performer of dirty blues because of the suggestive nature of some of his songs, such as "I Want a Bowlegged Woman" and "Big Ten Inch Record".

== Career ==
Jackson was born Benjamin Joseph Jackson in Cleveland, Ohio. He played violin as a child but quickly became drawn to the saxophone and started his first band, the Harlem Hotshots, while he was still in high school. In 1943, he was recruited as a saxophonist by the bandleader Lucky Millinder, and the musicians in Millinder's band gave him the nickname "Bull Moose" for his appearance. He began singing when he was required to stand in for Wynonie Harris at a show in Lubbock, Texas.

Millinder encouraged Jackson to sign a solo contract with Syd Nathan of King Records to play rhythm and blues. The first recording in his own right was "I Know Who Threw the Whiskey", in 1946, an answer song to Millinder's "Who Threw the Whiskey in the Well". The following year, his recording of "I Love You, Yes I Do" reputedly became the first R&B single to sell a million copies, holding the number 1 spot on the R&B chart for three weeks and crossing over to the pop chart, where it reached number 24.

He formed his own group, the Buffalo Bearcats, and over the next five years recorded in a wide variety of musical styles, including both romantic crooning and bawdy jump blues. His big hits in 1948 included the double-sided hit "All My Love Belongs to You" / "I Want a Bowlegged Woman", and his biggest R&B chart hit, "I Can't Go on Without You", which stayed at number 1 on the R&B chart for eight weeks. He also made an appearance in the 1948 film Boarding House Blues, with Millinder.

In 1949, Jackson covered "Why Don't You Haul Off and Love Me", a song that been successful for Wayne Raney and also for several country-and-western performers. In May 1951 he recorded "Wonder When My Baby's Coming Home" with his Bearcats.

Jackson toured throughout the late 1940s and early 1950s. Around 1951, his band included the bebop composer and arranger Tadd Dameron on piano and Benny Golson, another jazz musician, on saxophone.

Some of Jackson's later risqué material, including "Big Ten Inch Record" and "Nosey Joe" (written by Jerry Leiber and Mike Stoller), caused a sensation during live performances but were too suggestive for the radio, and few of the records were sold. However, his band faithfully played "Big Ten Inch Record" at every show.

By the mid-1950s, Jackson was tired of touring and retired from music to work for a catering firm in Washington, D.C., although he occasionally still performed at private parties. In 1961, he re-recorded "I Love You, Yes I Do" with modern high-fidelity equipment and had a minor hit.

Twenty years later, the Flashcats, a blues band that performed in western Pennsylvania, Ohio, and West Virginia, regularly included "Big Ten Inch Record" in their performances. A local DJ reputedly told the Flashcats that he knew Bull Moose Jackson, and the band's frontman, Carl Grefensette, found him catering at Howard University. Grefensette convinced Jackson to perform with them, and they quickly became a sensation in western Pennsylvania. Jackson then made the Flashcats his backing band and began a revival of his career. He also recorded a comeback album, Moosemania! (1985).

During the 1980s, Jackson, then in his 60s, had an extremely successful run performing in the United States and internationally. However, he fell ill with lung cancer in 1987 and retired from the touring circuit in the spring of 1988. An old girlfriend of his came back to care for him during his final illness. He died in Cleveland on July 31, 1989.

== See also ==
- List of jump blues musicians
- List of artists who reached number one on the Billboard R&B chart
