= Hank Ballard =

American singer (1927–2003)

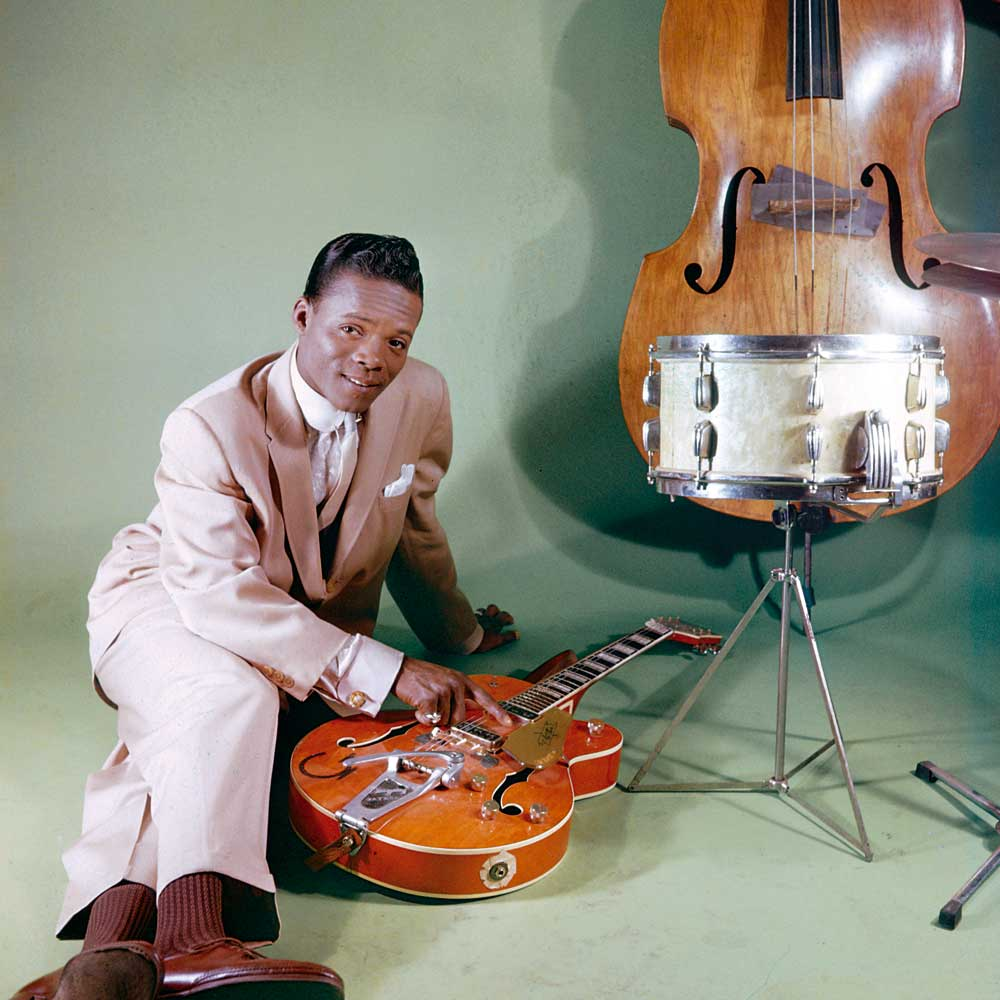
- Ballard in 1954

Background information
- Born: John Henry Kendricks; November 18, 1927; Detroit, Michigan, U.S.
- Died: March 2, 2003 (aged 75) Los Angeles, California, U.S.
- Genres: Blues; rock and roll; R&B; funk
- Occupations: Singer; songwriter
- Years active: 1951–2003
- Labels: Federal; King; People; Stang
- Formerly of: The Midnighters

Hank Ballard (born John Henry Kendricks; November 18, 1927 – March 2, 2003) was an American singer and songwriter, the lead vocalist of the Midnighters and one of the first rock and roll artists to emerge in the early 1950s. John Henry played an integral part in the development of the genre, releasing the hit singles "Work with Me, Annie" and answer songs "Annie Had a Baby" and "Annie's Aunt Fannie" with his Midnighters. He later wrote and originally recorded (in 1959) "The Twist" which was covered a year later by Chubby Checker, this second version spreading the popularity of the dance. He was inducted into the Rock and Roll Hall of Fame in 1990.

== Early years ==
Ballard was born John Henry Kendricks in Detroit, Michigan. He and his brother, Dove, grew up and attended school in Bessemer, Alabama, after the death of their father. He lived with his paternal aunt and her husband, and began singing in church. His major vocal inspiration during his formative years was the "Singing Cowboy", Gene Autry, and in particular, his signature song, "Back in the Saddle Again". Ballard returned to Detroit in his teens and later worked on the assembly line for Ford.

== Hank Ballard and the Midnighters ==
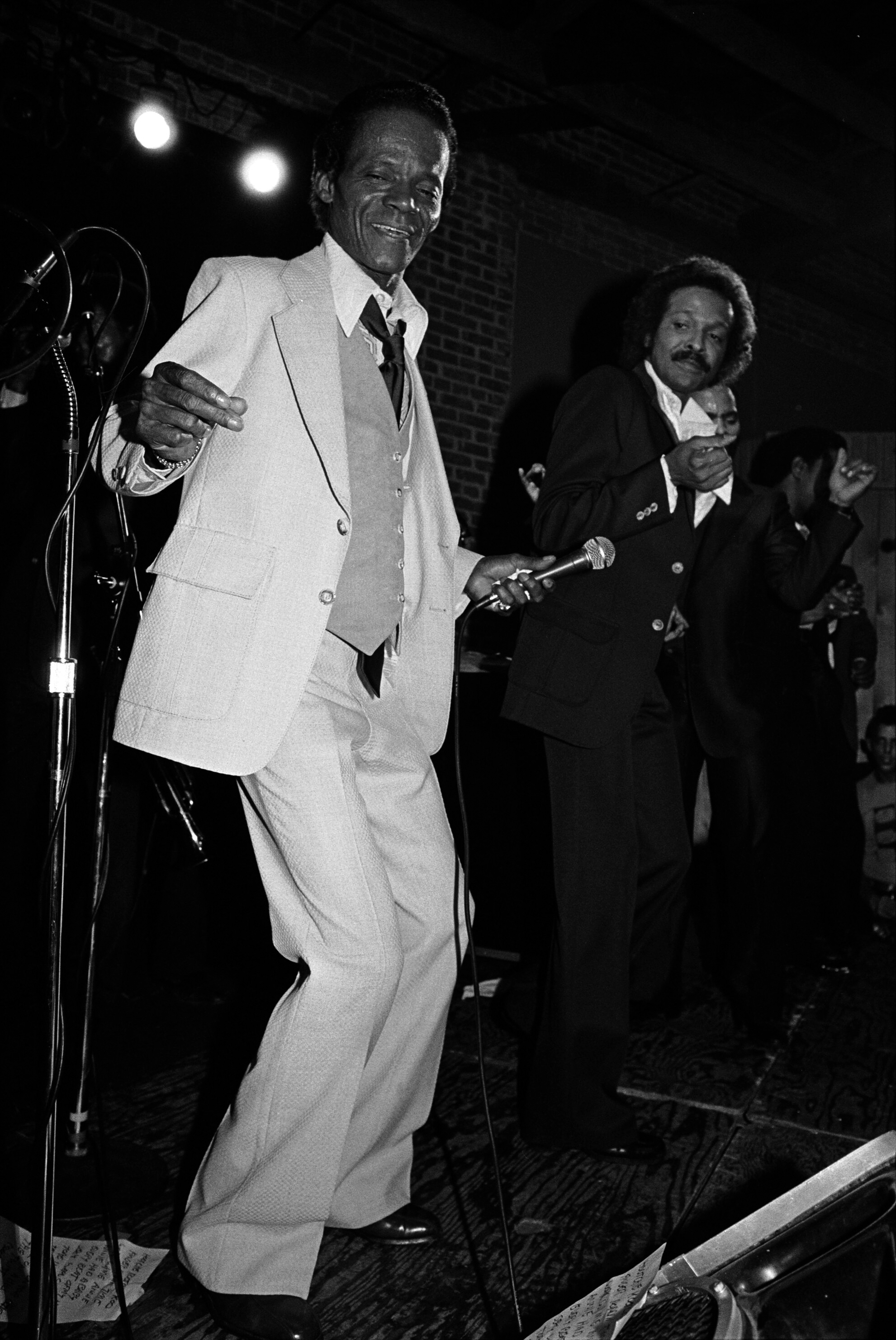
Hank Ballard and the Midnighters, 1982

In 1953, Ballard joined doo-wop group the Royals, which had previously been discovered by Johnny Otis and signed to Federal Records (a division of King Records), in Cincinnati. Ballard joined Henry Booth, Charles Sutton, Sonny Woods and Alonzo Tucker in the group, replacing previous singer Lawson Smith, who went on to serve in the Army.

The Royals released "Get It" which Ballard wrote (1953), an R&B song with possibly sexually oriented lyrics, which some radio stations refused to play, although it still made it to number 6 on the US Billboard R&B chart.

The group then changed its name to the Midnighters to avoid confusion with the "5" Royales. In 1954, Ballard wrote a song called "Work with Me, Annie" that was drawn from "Get It". It became the Midnighters' first major R&B hit, spending seven weeks at number 1 on the R&B chart and also selling well in mainstream markets, along with the answer songs "Annie Had a Baby" and "Annie's Aunt Fannie"; all were banned by the FCC from radio air play. Their third major hit was "Sexy Ways", a song that cemented the band's reputation as one of the most risqué groups of the time.

They had four other R&B chart hits in 1954–55, but no others until 1959, by which time the group was billed as "Hank Ballard and The Midnighters" with their label changed from Federal to King, the parent label. Between 1959 and 1961 they had several more both on the R&B and Pop charts, starting with "Teardrops on Your Letter", a number 4 R&B hit in 1959, that had as its B-side the Ballard-written song "The Twist". A few months later, Chubby Checker's cover version of the song went to number 1 on the Hot 100 chart. It would return to the top of the charts again in 1962 – the only song in the rock and roll era to reach number 1 in two different non-consecutive years.

Ballard and the Midnighters had several other hit singles in the early 1960s, including the Grammy-nominated "Finger Poppin' Time" (1960) and "Let's Go, Let's Go, Let's Go" (1960) which hit number 7 and number 6, respectively, on the Billboard pop chart. They did not reach the charts again after 1962 and dissolved in 1965.

== Later career ==
After the Midnighters disbanded, Ballard launched a solo career. His 1968 single, "How You Gonna Get Respect (When You Haven't Cut Your Process Yet)", was his biggest post-Midnighters hit, peaking at number 15 on the R&B chart. James Brown produced Ballard's 1969 album You Can't Keep a Good Man Down. A 1972 single, "From the Love Side", credited to Hank Ballard and the Midnight Lighters, went to number 43 on the R&B chart. Ballard also appeared on Brown's 1972 album Get on the Good Foot, on two tracks, "Recitation By Hank Ballard", that features Ballard describing Brown and the album, and “Funky Side of Town”, in duet, with James Brown.

One-off sides, "Sunday Morning, Coming Down", and "I'm a Junkie for My Baby's Love", followed in the 1970s. He had some more upbeat releases in the mid-1970s, including "Hey There Sexy Lady" and "Let’s Go Streaking", as well as a beat ballad, "Love On Love". In 1979, he had moderate success with the disco number, "Freak Your Boom-Boom".

During the 1960s, Ballard's cousin, Florence Ballard, was a member of the Detroit girl group the Supremes. In the mid-1980s, Ballard re-formed The Midnighters and the group performed until 2002.

== Death ==
On March 2, 2003, he died at age 75 of throat cancer in his Los Angeles home. He was buried at Greenwood Cemetery in Atlanta, Georgia.

== Legacy ==
In 1990, Ballard was inducted into the Rock and Roll Hall of Fame; the other Midnighters were inducted in 2012.

In 2010, Hank Ballard & The Midnighters were voted into the Michigan Rock and Roll Legends Hall of Fame.

Ballard was the great-uncle of NFL player Christian Ballard. He was a cousin of original Supremes member Florence Ballard.

== Discography ==
=== Solo albums ===
- A Star in Your Eyes (King Records, 1964)
- You Can't Keep a Good Man Down (King Records, 1968)
- Hanging with Hank (Stang Records, 1976)

=== Singles ===
- Note: Credited as Hank Ballard and the Midnighters unless stated otherwise.

List of singles, with year released, name of B-side, selected chart positions and album name shown
Year	Single (A-side, B-side) Both sides from same album except where indicated	Chart positions			Album
Year	Single (A-side, B-side) Both sides from same album except where indicated	US Pop	US R&B	Canada	Album
1952	"Every Beat of My Heart" b/w "All Night Long"; The Royals	–	–	–	Non-album tracks
1952	"Starting from Tonight" b/w "I Know I Love You So"; The Royals	–	–	–	Non-album tracks
1952	"Moonrise" b/w "Fifth Street Blues" (Non-album track); The Royals	–	–	–	Their Greatest Hits
1952	"A Love in My Heart" b/w "I'll Never Let Her Go"; The Royals	–	–	–	Non-album tracks
1952	"Are You Forgetting" b/w "What Did I Do"; The Royals	–	–	–	Non-album tracks
1953	"The Shrine of St. Cecelia" b/w "I Feel So Blue"; The Royals	–	–	–	Non-album tracks
1953	"Get It" b/w "No It Ain't" (Non-album track); The Royals	–	6	–	Their Greatest Hits
1953	"Hello Miss Fine" b/w "I Feel That-A-Way" (from The Twistin' Fools); The Royals	–	–	–	Non-album tracks
1953	"That's It" b/w "Someone Like You"; The Royals	–	–	–	Non-album tracks
1954	"Work with Me, Annie" b/w "Until I Die" (from The Twistin' Fools); Original pressings as by the Royals; Later pressings as by the Midnighters	22	1	–	Their Greatest Hits
1954	"Sexy Ways" b/w "Don't Say Your Last Goodbye" (from Singin' and Swingin'); The Midnighters	–	2	–	Their Greatest Hits
1954	"Annie Had a Baby" b/w "She's the One"; The Midnighters	–	1	–	Their Greatest Hits
1954	"Annie's Aunt Fannie" b/w "Crazy Loving (Stay with Me); The Midnighters	–	10	–	Their Greatest Hits
1954	"Stingy Little Thing" b/w "Tell Them"; The Midnighters	–	–	–	Singin' and Swingin'
1955	"Moonrise" b/w "She's the One"; The Midnighters	–	–	–	Their Greatest Hits
1955	"Ashamed of Myself" b/w "Ring-A-Ling-A-Ling"; The Midnighters	–	–	–	Singin' and Swingin'
1955	"Why Are We Apart" b/w "Switchie Witchie Titchie" (from Their Greatest Hits); The Midnighters	–	–	–	Mr. Rhythm and Blues
1955	"Henry's Got Flat Feet (Can't Dance No More)" b/w "Whatsonever You Do" (from Singin' and Swingin') "The Midnighters	–	14	–	Their Greatest Hits
1955	"It's Love Baby (24 Hours A Day)" b/w "Looka Here" (from Let's Go Again); The Midnighters	–	10	–	Their Greatest Hits
1955	"That Woman" b/w "Give It Up" (from Mr. Rhythm and Blues); The Midnighters	–	–	–	Let's Go Again
1955	"Don't Change Your Pretty Ways" b/w "We'll Never Meet Again" (from The Twistin' Fools); The Midnighters	–	–	–	Let's Go Again
1955	"Rock and Roll Wedding" b/w "That House on the Hill"; The Midnighters	–	–	–	Singin' and Swingin'
1956	"Partners for Life" b/w "Sweet Mama, Do Right" (from Singin' and Swingin'); The Midnighters	–	–	–	Volume 2
1956	"Open Up the Back Door" b/w "Rock, Granny, Roll" (from Let's Go Again); The Midnighters	–	–	–	Volume 2
1956	"Early One Morning" b/w "Tore Up Over You" (from Their Greatest Hits); The Midnighters	–	–	–	Volume 2
1956	"I'll Be Home Someday" b/w "Come On and Get It" (from Let's Go Again); The Midnighters	–	–	–	Singin' and Swingin'
1957	"Let Me Hold Your Hand" b/w "Ooh Ooh Baby" (from Singin' and Swingin'); The Midnighters	–	–	–	Volume 2
1957	"E Basta Cosi" b/w "In the Doorway Crying"; The Midnighters	–	–	–	Volume 2
1957	"Is Your Love for Real" b/w "Oh So Happy"; The Midnighters	–	–	–	Volume 2
1957	"What Made You Change Your Mind" b/w "Let 'Em Roll"; The Midnighters	–	–	–	Volume 2
1958	"Daddy's Little Baby" b/w "Stay By My Side"; The Midnighters	–	–	–	Volume 2
1958	"Baby Please" b/w "Ow-Wow-Oo-Wee"; The Midnighters	–	–	–	Let's Go Again
1959	"Teardrops on Your Letter"	87	4	–	Singin' and Swingin'
1959	"The Twist"	28	16	–	Singin' and Swingin'
1959	"Kansas City" b/w "I'll Keep You Happy"	72	16	–	The One and Only
1959	"Sugaree" b/w "Rain Down Tears"	–	–	–	The One and Only
1959	"Cute Little Ways" b/w "House With No Windows"	–	–	–	The One and Only
1959	"I Could Love You" b/w "Never Knew"	–	–	–	Mr. Rhythm and Blues
1959	"I Said I Wouldn't Beg You" b/w "Look At Little Sister"	–	–	–	Mr. Rhythm and Blues
1960	"The Coffee Grind" b/w "Waiting"	–	21	–	Mr. Rhythm and Blues
1960	"Finger Poppin' Time"; Original B-side: "I Love You, I Love You So-o-o"; Later B-side: "I'm Thinking of You" (from Spotlight on Hank Ballard)	7	2	5	Mr. Rhythm and Blues
1960	"The Twist" b/w "Teardrops on Your Letter"; Reissue	28	6	2	Singin' and Swingin'
1960	"Let's Go, Let's Go, Let's Go" b/w "If You'd Forgive Me"	6	1	16	Spotlight on Hank Ballard
1961	"The Hoochi Coochi Coo" b/w "I'm Thinking of You"	23	3	17	Spotlight on Hank Ballard
1961	"Let's Go Again (Where We Went Last Night)" b/w "Deep Blue Sea"	39	17	–	Let's Go Again
1961	"The Continental Walk" b/w "What Is This I See"	33	12	22	Dance Along
1961	"The Switch-A-Roo"	26	3	–	Dance Along
1961	"The Float"	92	10	–	Dance Along
1961	"Nothing but Good"	49	9	–	Dance Along
1961	"Keep On Dancing"	66	-	–	Dance Along
1961	"Big Red Sunset" b/w "Can't You See I Need a Friend"	–	–	–	Dance Along
1961	"I'm Gonna Miss You" b/w "Do You Remember" (from The Twistin' Fools)	–	–	–	Dance Along
1962	"Do You Know How to Twist" b/w "Broadway"; Hank Ballard	87	–	–	The Twistin' Fools
1962	"It's Twistin' Time" b/w "Autumn Breeze"	–	–	–	Jumpin'
1962	"Good Twistin' Tonight" b/w "I'm Young" (from Dance Along)	–	–	–	Jumpin'
1962	"I Want to Thank You" b/w "Excuse Me"	–	–	–	Jumpin'
1962	"Shaky Mae" b/w "I Love and Care for You"	–	–	–	A Star In Your Eyes
1962	"Bring Me Your Love" b/w "She's the One" (from Their Greatest Hits)	–	–	–	A Star In Your Eyes
1962	"Christmas Time for Everyone but Me" b/w "Santa Claus Is Coming"	–	–	–	Non-album tracks
1963	"(All the Things in Life That) Pleases You" b/w "The Rising Tide"	–	–	–	The 1963 Sound
1963	"(I'm Going Back to) The House on the Hill" b/w "That Low Down Move"	–	–	–	The 1963 Sound
1963	"Walkin' and Talkin'" b/w "How Could You Leave Your Man Alone"	–	–	–	The 1963 Sound
1963	"It's Love Baby (24 Hours a Day)" b/w "Those Lonely Lonely Feelings"	–	–	–	A Star in Your Eyes
1963	"I'm Learning" b/w "Buttin' In" (from A Star in Your Eyes)	–	–	–	Jumpin'
1964	"These Young Girls" b/w "I Don't Know How to Do but One Thing" (from A Star in Your Eyes)	–	–	–	Spotlight on Hank Ballard
1964	"She's Got a Whole Lot of Soul" b/w "Stay Away from My Baby" (from A Star In Your Eyes)	–	–	–	The One and Only
1964	"Daddy Rolling Stone" b/w "What's Your Name" (from Jumpin')	–	–	–	Dance Along
1964	"Let's Get the Show on the Road" b/w "A Winner Never Quits"	–	–	–	Those Lazy, Lazy Days
1964	"One Monkey Don't Stop No Show" b/w "Watch What I Tell You"	–	–	–	Those Lazy, Lazy Days
1965	"Poppin' the Whip" b/w "You, Just You"	–	–	–	Non-album tracks
1966	"Sloop and Slide" b/w "My Sun Is Going Down"	–	–	–	Non-album tracks
1966	"Togetherness" b/w "I'm Ready"	–	–	–	Non-album tracks
1966	"(Dance with Me) Annie" b/w "He Came Along"	–	–	–	Non-album tracks
1967	"Dance Till It Hurtcha" b/w "Here Comes the Hurt"	–	–	–	Non-album tracks
1967	"You're in Real Good Hands" b/w "Unwind Yourself" (from You Can't Keep a Good Man Down)	–	–	–	Non-album tracks
1967	"Which Way Should I Turn" b/w "Funky Soul Train"	–	–	–	You Can't Keep a Good Man Down
1968	"Come on Wit' It" b/w "I'm Back to Stay" (Non-album track)	–	–	–	You Can't Keep a Good Man Down
1968	"How You Gonna Get Respect" b/w "Teardrops on Your Letter"; Hank Ballard along with "The Dapps"	–	15	–	You Can't Keep a Good Man Down
1969	"You're So Sexy" b/w "Thrill on the Hill"; Hank Ballard along with "The Dapps"	–	–	–	You Can't Keep a Good Man Down
1969	"Are You Lonely for Me Baby" b/w "With You Sweet Lovin' Self"	–	–	–	You Can't Keep a Good Man Down
1969	"Butter Your Popcorn" b/w "Funky Soul Train" (from You Can't Keep a Good Man Down)	–	–	–	Non-album tracks
1969	"Blackenized" b/w "Come on Wit' It" (from You Can't Keep a Good Man Down)	–	–	–	Non-album tracks
1970	"Love Made a Fool of Me" b/w "Sunday Morning Coming Down"	–	–	–	Non-album tracks
1972	"From the Love Side" b/w "Finger Poppin' Time"; Hank Ballard and the Midnight Lighters	–	43	–	Non-album tracks
1972	"Annie Had a Baby" b/w "Teardrops on Your Letter"; Hank Ballard	–	–	–	Non-album tracks
1972	"Finger Poppin' Time" b/w "With Your Sweet Lovin' Self"; Hank Ballard	–	–	–	Non-album tracks
1974	"Let's Go Streaking"—Part 1 b/w Part 2 Hank Ballard	–	–	–	Hanging with Hank
1975	"Hey There Sexy Lady" b/w Instrumental version of A-side	–	–	–	Hanging with Hank
1979	"Freak Your Boom Boom"—Part 1 b/w Part 2	–	–	–	Non-album tracks
"–" denotes releases that did not chart.
