= Slaughter's Big Rip-Off (album) =

Soundtrack album by James Brown
- Released: July 1973
- Recorded: October 14, 1969 – May 25, 1973
- Studios: King (Cincinnati, Ohio); Bobby Smith (Macon, Georgia); Starday-King (Nashville, Tennessee); A & R (New York City); United Artists (Los Angeles, California)
- Genre: Funk
- Labels: Polydor; 6015
- Producer: James Brown

James Brown chronology
Black Caesar (1973)	Slaughter's Big Rip-Off (1973)	The Payback (1973)

Singles from Slaughter's Big Rip-Off
- 1. "How Long Can I Keep It Up" Released: June 1973; 2. "Sexy, Sexy, Sexy / Slaughter Theme" Released: August 1973

Professional ratings
Review scores
Source	Rating
Allmusic	2.5/5 stars

Slaughter's Big Rip-Off is a soundtrack album recorded by James Brown for the film of the same name and released in July 1973 by Polydor Records. The album also features The J.B.'s and Lyn Collins. Although the soundtrack was created for the film Slaughter's Big Rip-Off, the score was replaced by new, generic funk sounds and versions of songs from the Coffy soundtrack on all home releases.

== Track listing ==
All tracks are written by James Brown, Charles Bobbit, Fred Wesley; except where indicated.

Side one
No.	Title	Writer(s)	Length
1.	"Slaughter Theme"		4:00
2.	"Tryin' To Get Over"		2:30
3.	"Transmograpfication"	James Brown, David Matthews	2:00
4.	"Happy for the Poor"		2:43
5.	"Brother Rap"	James Brown	3:04
6.	"Big Strong"		3:15
7.	"Really, Really, Really"		1:48

Side two
No.	Title	Writer(s)	Length
8.	"Sexy, Sexy, Sexy"	James Brown	3:10
9.	"To My Brother"	Fred Wesley, James Brown	2:10
10.	"How Long Can I Keep It Up" (featuring Lyn Collins)		5:30
11.	"People Get Up and Drive Your Funky Soul"	James Brown, Fred Wesley, St. Clair Pinckney	3:40
12.	"King Slaughter"		2:45
13.	"Straight Ahead"		2:45

== Personnel ==
- James Brown – lead vocals, electric organ, piano
- Lyn Collins – lead vocals ("How Long Can I Keep It Up")

=== The James Brown Band (October 14, 1969) ===
"Brother Rap"

- Richard "Kush" Griffith, Joe Davis – trumpet
- Fred Wesley – trombone
- Maceo Parker, Eldee Williams – tenor saxophone
- Jimmy Nolen, Alfonzo Kellum – electric guitar
- "Sweet" Charles Sherrell – bass guitar
- Art Lopez – congas
- Clyde Stubblefield – drums

=== Studio band arranged by David Matthews (February 12, 1971) ===
"Sexy, Sexy, Sexy"

- unidentified – alto saxophone
- unidentified – baritone saxophone
- David Matthews – electric organ
- Kenny Poole, unidentified– electric guitar
- unidentified – bass guitar
- William "Beau Dollar" Bowman – drums

=== The J.B.'s (May 13, 1971) ===
"To My Brother"

- Fred Wesley – trombone
- Jimmy Parker – alto saxophone
- St. Clair Pinckney – tenor saxophone
- Hearlon "Cheese" Martin, Robert Coleman – electric guitar
- Fred Thomas – bass guitar
- Johnny Griggs – congas
- Alfred Thomas – drums

=== Studio band arranged by David Matthews (September 27, 1972) ===
"Transmograpfication"

- Randy Brecker, Jon Faddis – trumpet
- Fred Wesley, Benny Powell – trombone
- Joe Farrell, Michael Brecker – tenor saxophone
- Seldon Powell – baritone saxophone
- Kenny Asher – electric piano
- Hugh McCracken, probably David Spinoza – electric guitar
- Ron Carter – bass guitar
- Steve Gadd – drums

=== Studio band arranged by James Brown and Fred Wesley (May 1973) ===
"Slaughter Theme", "People Get Up and Drive Your Funky Soul"

- Cat Anderson, Eugene "Snooky" Young – trumpet
- Fred Wesley, Benny Powell – trombone
- Ernie Watts – tenor saxophone
- Joe Sample – electric piano
- David T. Walker – electric guitar
- Chuck Rainey – bass guitar
- Harvey Mason or Leon "Ndugu" Chancler – drums

All other tracks feature unidentified musicians arranged by James Brown and Fred Wesley.
