= Everybody's Doin' the Hustle & Dead on the Double Bump =

Studio album by James Brown
- Released: August 1975
- Recorded: September 20, 1973 – July 1975
- Studio: Starday-King Studios (Nashville, Tennessee); A & R Studios (New York City, New York); Sound Ideas Studios (New York City, New York)
- Genre: Funk; Soul; R&B
- Length: 41:17
- Label: Polydor; 6054
- Producer: James Brown

James Brown chronology
Sex Machine Today (1975)	Everybody's Doin' the Hustle & Dead on the Double Bump (1975)	Hot (1976)

Singles from Everybody's Doin' the Hustle & Dead on the Double Bump
- 1. "Hustle!!! (Dead on It)" Released: July 24, 1975; 2. "Superbad, Superslick" Released: October 20, 1975

Professional ratings
Review scores
Source	Rating
AllMusic	2/5 stars
Robert Christgau	B−
The Rolling Stone Album Guide	2/5 stars

Everybody's Doin' the Hustle & Dead on the Double Bump is the 41st studio album by American musician James Brown. The album was released in August 1975 by Polydor Records.

== Track listing ==
All tracks are written by James Brown; except where specified.

No.	Title	Writer(s)	Length
1.	"Hustle!!! (Dead on It)"		5:01
2.	"Papa's Got a Brand New Bag"		5:33
3.	"Your Love"		4:09
4.	"Turn On The Heat And Build Some Fire"		6:08
5.	"Superbad, Superslick"		6:49
6.	"Calm & Cool"		5:48
7.	"Kansas City"	Jerry Leiber, Mike Stoller	7:47

== Personnel ==
=== Musicians ===
- James Brown – lead vocals, electric organ

==== The J.B.'s (1973) ====
"Your Love"; originally recorded as "I Got A Good Thing"

- Jerone "Jasaan" Sanford – trumpet
- Fred Wesley – trombone
- Maceo Parker – alto saxophone
- Hearlon "Cheese" Martin – electric guitar
- Fred Thomas – bass guitar
- Bob Both – sticks, additional production
- John Morgan – drums

==== The J.B.'s (1975) ====
"Turn On The Heat And Build Some Fire", "Kansas City"

- Russell Crimes – trumpet
- Fred Wesley – trombone
- Maceo Parker, Jimmy Parker – alto saxophone
- St. Clair Pinckney – tenor saxophone
- "Sweet" Charles Sherrell – clavinet
- Jimmy Nolen, Hearlon "Cheese" Martin – electric guitar
- Fred Thomas, Bernard Odum – bass guitar
- Johnny Griggs – congas
- John Morgan, John "Jabo" Starks – drums

==== Studio band conducted by David Matthews ====
"Hustle!!! (Dead On It)", "Superbad, Superslick"

- James Brown, Fred Wesley – backing vocals
- Fred Wesley – trombone, backing vocals
- Leon Pendarvis – clavinet
- Joe Beck, John Tropea or Duncan Cleary – electric guitar
- Wilbur Bascomb or Will Lee – bass guitar
- unknown – backing vocals, flute, percussion, drums

=== Technical ===
- James Brown – arrangements
- Fred Wesley – production supervision, arrangements
- Bob Both – production supervision, engineer
- David Stone, Major Little – assistant engineer
- Roger Huyssen – artwork
- Bob Both - production supervision, recording and mixing engineer
- David Stone, Major Little - assistant engineer
- Douglas Gervasi - cover photography
