= In the Jungle Groove =

1986 compilation album by James Brown

Compilation album by James Brown
- Released: August 1986
- Recorded: September 3, 1969–July 12, 1971
- Studio: King Studios in Cincinnati; Criteria Studio in Miami; Bobby Smith Studios in Macon; A & R Studios in New York
- Genre: Funk
- Length: 63:17
- Label: Polydor
- Producer: James Brown (original recordings), Cliff White, Tim Rogers

James Brown chronology
Dead on the Heavy Funk (1985)	In the Jungle Groove (1986)	Groove (1986)

In the Jungle Groove is a compilation album by American funk musician James Brown, released in August 1986 by Polydor Records.

== Background ==
Originally issued to capitalize on the popularity of Brown's music in hip hop sampling circles at the time, it includes the first album release of the much-sampled single "Funky Drummer" (1969), along with a selection of previously unreleased tracks, alternate takes, and remixes. The original recordings were produced by Brown, while the reissue was produced by Cliff White and Tim Rogers. A similar follow-up compilation, Motherlode, was released in 1988.

The album's title is taken from a song Brown recorded in the studio in August 1970. The full recording of the song "In the Jungle Groove" remains unissued; however, on the album its introduction is appended to the beginning of "I Got to Move", another previously unreleased song recorded at the same session. A remastered and expanded 2003 reissue of In the Jungle Groove added a bonus track, an extended version of "Blind Man Can See It" from the Black Caesar soundtrack album.

== Critical reception ==
Professional ratings
Review scores
Source	Rating
AllMusic	4.5/5 stars
Encyclopedia of Popular Music	4/5 stars
Mojo	4/5 stars
Pitchfork	8.6/10
Rolling Stone	4/5 stars
The Rolling Stone Album Guide	5/5 stars

In a contemporary review, Richard Hallman of The Atlanta Journal-Constitution recommended the album to "connoisseurs and collectors", and said that it "should be considered for purchase only by those who take their Godfather very seriously." Ken Tucker, writing in the Chicago Tribune, commended Polygram for their "admirable project of re-releasing the fascinating music Brown made during the late '60s and early 1970s, when he disappeared from the pop charts to record much of his most profoundly funky music." He cited Clyde Stubblefield's performance on "Funky Drummer" as the highlight and said that the album "serves to remind the listener that, in addition to his greatness as a singer and a rhythmic innovator, Brown is also an exceptional band leader." In the Jungle Groove was voted as the fourth best reissue of 1986 in The Village Voice's annual Pazz & Jop critics' poll. The newspaper's Robert Christgau called it "long-promised, worth-waiting for, full-length, '69-'71 dance classics", while ranking it as the eighth best reissue of 1986.

In a retrospective article for Rolling Stone, Christgau said that, because most of the "renowned" albums are available on Star Time (1991), In the Jungle Groove is "for serious students only", even though "Brown is the rare artist who improves with length." Douglas Wolk, writing for Wondering Sound, said that it "inspired a million hip-hop samples" and featured "blisteringly intense funk workouts" from a period when Brown and his 1970–71 band were "making some of the greatest dance records of that era." In 2000, Vibe magazine included it on their list of the 100 essential albums of the 20th century. In 2003, Rolling Stone ranked it number 330 on their list of the 500 greatest albums of all time, and 329 in the 2012 revised list. In a review of the album's reissue, Brian James from PopMatters felt that In the Jungle Groove deserves a re-release "because the music earns it. Its origins as a quickie cash-in don’t detract from the undeniable power of the grooves unleashed within, nor are the proceedings hurt by the revolving-door lineup of the period." James argued that it showcases Brown's sidemen, who "forged into a mold that was [his] stunning creation", and recommended it to listeners who are interested in Brown or funk music.

== Track listing ==
Side one
No.	Title	Writer(s)	Length
1.	"It's a New Day"	James Brown	6:15
2.	"Funky Drummer"	James Brown	9:13
Total length:			15:28

Side two
No.	Title	Writer(s)	Length
3.	"Give It Up or Turnit a Loose" (Remix)	Charles Bobbit	6:09
4.	"I Got to Move" (previously unreleased)	James Brown	7:12
5.	"Funky Drummer" (Bonus Beat Reprise)	James Brown	2:54
Total length:			16:15

Side three
No.	Title	Writer(s)	Length
6.	"Talkin' Loud and Sayin' Nothing" (Remix)	James Brown, Bobby Byrd	7:40
7.	"Get Up, Get into It, Get Involved" (Mono)	James Brown, Bobby Byrd, Ron Lenhoff	7:05
Total length:			14:45

Side four
No.	Title	Writer(s)	Length
8.	"Soul Power" (Re-edit)	James Brown	8:07
9.	"Hot Pants (She Got to Use What She Got to Get What She Wants)"	James Brown	8:42
Total length:			16:49 63:17

2003 reissue bonus track
No.	Title	Writer(s)	Length
10.	"Blind Man Can See It" (Extended)	James Brown	7:19
Total length:			70:36

== Personnel ==
Credits for In the Jungle Groove adapted from liner notes.

- James Brown – Organ, Vocals, Producer
- Bobby Byrd – Organ, Vocals
- Robert Lee Coleman – Guitar
- Bootsy Collins – Bass
- Phelps "Catfish" Collins – Guitar
- J.C. Convertino – Engineer
- Russell Crimes – Trumpet
- Joseph Davis – Trumpet
- Dennis M. Drake – Engineer, Digital Mastering
- Jeff Faville – Design
- Richard "Kush" Griffith – Trumpet
- Johnny Griggs – Conga
- Clayton "Chicken" Gunnells – Trumpet
- Darryl "Hasaan" Jamison – Trumpet
- Alphonso "Country" Kellum – Guitar
- Danny Krivit – Editing
- Art Lopez – Conga
- Hearlon "Cheese" Martin – Guitar

- Robert McCollough – Tenor saxophone
- Jerone "Jasaan Sanford" Melson – Trumpet
- Jimmy Nolen – Guitar
- Jimmy Parker – Alto saxophone
- Maceo Parker – Tenor saxophone
- Melvin Parker – Drums
- St. Clair Pinckney – Baritone saxophone
- Tim Rogers – Producer, Mixing
- "Sweet" Charles Sherrell – Bass
- John "Jabo" Starks – Drums
- Clyde Stubblefield – Drums
- Fred Thomas – Bass
- Louis Tilford – Baritone saxophone
- Howie Weinberg – Mastering
- Fred Wesley – Trombone
- Clifford White – Producer, Liner Notes
- Eldee Williams – Tenor saxophone

== See also ==
- Motherlode (James Brown album)

== Bibliography ==
- Nathan Brackett, Christian Hoard (2004). The New Rolling Stone Album Guide. Completely Revised and Updated 4th Edition. Simon and Schuster. ISBN 0-7432-0169-8.
- Colin Larkin (1998). Virgin Encyclopedia of R&B and Soul. Virgin Books. ISBN 0-7535-0241-0.
