= Motherlode (James Brown album) =

Compilation album by James Brown
- Released: 1988
- Recorded: December 12, 1967 – September 14, 1972
- Venue: Bell Auditorium (Augusta, Georgia) (Track 5 & 6) Apollo Theater (New York City, New York) (Track 1)
- Studio: King (Cincinnati, Ohio) (Track 2, 4 & 8); RCA (Los Angeles, California) (Track 7); Mastersound (Los Angeles, California) (Track 12); Criteria (Miami, Florida) (Track 6 & 13); Starday-King (Nashville, Tennessee) (Track 3); Bobby Smith (Augusta, Georgia) (Track 11); United Artists (Los Angeles, California) (Track 10)
- Genre: Funk
- Length: 55:26
- Label: Polydor; 837 126-2
- Producer: James Brown, Tim Rogers, Cliff White

James Brown chronology
James Brown's Funky People (Part 2) (1988)	Motherlode (1988)	Roots of a Revolution (1989)

Professional ratings
Review scores
Source	Rating
Allmusic	4/5 stars
Robert Christgau	A−
eMusic	4.5/5 stars
Q	4/5 stars
The Rolling Stone Album Guide	4/5 stars

Motherlode is a 1988 James Brown compilation album. Created as a follow-up to the successful 1986 compilation In the Jungle Groove, it similarly focuses on Brown's funk recordings of the late 1960s and early 1970s. It includes live performances and remixes as well as studio recordings, most of them previously unissued. Writing in 2007, critic Robert Christgau called it "the finest of the classic [James Brown] comps". Highlights include a live "Say It Loud – I'm Black and I'm Proud", the first album release of "I Got Ants in My Pants (and I Want to Dance)", the latter-day UK chart hit "She's the One", and a nine-minute-long remix of "People Get Up and Drive Your Funky Soul" from the Slaughter's Big Rip-Off soundtrack.

In 2003 Motherlode was reissued with remastered sound, an unedited version of the track "Can I Get Some Help", and two bonus tracks, the 1969 song "You've Changed" and an alternate mix of 1976's "Bodyheat".

== Track listing ==
=== Original 1988 release ===
Side one
No.	Title	Writer(s)	Length
1.	"There It Is" (Live)	James Brown, St. Clair Pinckney	3:06
2.	"She's the One"	Hank Ballard, James Brown	2:52
3.	"Since You Been Gone" (Duet with Bobby Byrd)	James Brown	5:33
4.	"Untitled Instrumental" (Performed by The J.B.'s)	James Brown	3:22
5.	"Say It Loud (Say It Live)"	James Brown, Pee Wee Ellis	4:52
6.	"Can I Get Some Help" (Unedited)	James Brown	4:56

Side two
No.	Title	Writer(s)	Length
7.	"You Got to Have a Mother for Me"	James Brown, Pee Wee Ellis	5:10
8.	"Funk Bomb" (Instrumental)	James Brown	4:12
9.	"Baby Here I Come"	James Brown	4:27
10.	"People Get Up and Drive Your Funky Soul" (Remix)	Chales Bobbit, James Brown, St. Clair Pinckney, Fred Wesley	9:04
11.	"I Got Ants in My Pants (and I Want to Dance)" (bonus track)	James Brown	7:25

=== Expanded 2003 release ===
No.	Title	Writer(s)	Length
1.	"There It Is" (Live)	James Brown, St. Clair Pinckney	3:06
2.	"She's the One"	Hank Ballard, James Brown	2:52
3.	"Since You Been Gone" (Duet with Bobby Byrd)	James Brown	5:33
4.	"Untitled Instrumental" (Performed by The J.B.'s)	James Brown	3:22
5.	"Say It Loud (Say It Live)"	James Brown, Pee Wee Ellis	4:52
6.	"Can I Get Some Help" (Unedited)	James Brown	8:57
7.	"You Got to Have a Mother for Me"	James Brown, Pee Wee Ellis	5:10
8.	"Funk Bomb" (Instrumental)	James Brown	4:12
9.	"Baby Here I Come"	James Brown	4:27
10.	"People Get Up and Drive Your Funky Soul" (Remix)	Chales Bobbit, James Brown, St. Clair Pinckney, Fred Wesley	9:04
11.	"I Got Ants in My Pants (and I Want to Dance)" (Remix)	James Brown	7:25
12.	"You've Changed" (bonus track)	James Brown	3:18
13.	"Bodyheat" (Alternate Mix) (bonus track)	Deanna Brown, Deidre Brown, Yamma Brown	11:53

== Personnel ==
- vocals – James Brown (tracks: 1 to 3, 5 to 7, 9 to 13)
- trumpet – Jerone Jasaan Sanford (tracks: 1, 4, 11), Joseph Davis (tracks: 2, 5, 6, 9), Richard Griffith (tracks: 2, 5 to 7, 9)
- trombone – Fred Wesley (tracks: 1, 2, 5 to 7, 9 to 11)
- alto saxophone, tenor saxophone – Maceo Parker (tracks: 2, 5 to 10)
- tenor saxophone – Eldee Williams (tracks: 2, 5, 9)
- tenor saxophone, baritone saxophone – St. Clair Pinckney (tracks: 1, 4 to 11)
- electric guitar – Alfonzo Kellum (tracks: 2, 5 to 9), Hearlon "Cheese" Martin (tracks: 1, 4, 11), Jimmy Nolen (tracks: 1, 2, 5 to 10, 12 to 13), Phelps "Catfish" Collins (tracks: 3 and 4)
- bass guitar – "Sweet" Charles Sherrell (tracks: 2, 5 to 7, 9), William "Bootsy" Collins (tracks: 3 and 4), Fred Thomas (tracks: 1, 10, 11)
- percussion – Johnny Griggs (tracks: 1, 3, 4, 10)
- drums – Clyde Stubblefield (tracks: 3 to 5, 8, 12), John "Jabo" Starks (tracks: 1, 4, 5, 9, 11), Melvin Parker (tracks: 2, 5, 6, 13), Nate Jones (track: 7), John Morgan (track: 10)
