= Reality (James Brown album) =

Studio album by James Brown
- Released: December 19, 1974
- Recorded: November 6, 1972 – December 1974
- Studios: A & R Studios (New York City, New York); United Artists Studios (Los Angeles, California); Sound Ideas Studios (New York City, New York)
- Genres: Funk; Soul
- Length: 41:17
- Labels: Polydor; 6039
- Producer: James Brown

James Brown chronology
Hell (1974)	Reality (1974)	Sex Machine Today (1975)

Singles from Reality
- 1. "Funky President (People It's Bad)" Released: October 1974; 2. "Reality" Released: February 1975

Reality is the 39th studio album by American musician James Brown. The album was released in 1974, by Polydor Records.

== Release ==
Reality was released in late 1974. It charted on the Billboard 200 for 10 weeks, peaking at number 56.

== Songs ==
Funky President & The Title Track were 2 singles released from the album.

Funky President is one of the most sampled songs in the genre of Hip-hop.

All For One contains an interpolation of Brown's previous hit Say It Loud – I'm Black and I'm Proud.

== Reception ==
Professional ratings
Review scores
Source	Rating
AllMusic	1.5/5 stars
Robert Christgau	B−
The Rolling Stone Album Guide	2.5/5 stars

In a contemporary review, the NME reviewed both Reality and Breakin' Bread, stating that the album were "pretty much up to the standard of his last few [records]." which he found was both positive and negative noting that there has been no major progression in his music since 1972. The review concluded that both albums were "very well produced, exceedingly exciting and irresistible for dancing, but who needs James Brown & The J.B.'s when you can have The Fatback Band or B.T. Express?"

AllMusic gave the album a negative review, noting that Brown's "insane schedule was catching up to him" and that it found him "at an artistic impasse." The reviewer noted that "it was foolish to expect a "fun" album from Brown during this time. He seemed to view America as a doomed nation, and considered the gas shortage, Watergate, and unemployment lines as signs of the coming apocalypse. A hint of sadness and ennui cloaks over the album." The review critiqued "The Twist" as Brown hitting a writer's block and that the cover of "Don't Fence Me In" was another sign of his "desperation". The review noted that the album contained "his worst ballads on record".

Reality was listed as the 46th best album of 1974 by Rolling Stone.

== Track listing ==
Track listing adapted from vinyl of Reality.

All tracks are written by James Brown, except where noted.

Side one
No.	Title	Writer(s)	Length
1.	"Reality"	James Brown, Fred Wesley, Gertrude Wesley	4:41
2.	"Funky President (People It's Bad)"		4:28
3.	"Further On Up the Road"	Bob Mack	4:14
4.	"Check Your Body"	Brown, Fred Wesley	4:31
5.	"Don't Fence Me In"	Cole Porter	3:57

Side two
No.	Title	Writer(s)	Length
6.	"All for One"	Brown, Fred Wesley	6:38
7.	"I'm Broken Hearted"		4:28
8.	"The Twist"	Hank Ballard	4:09
9.	"Who Can I Turn To (When Nobody Needs Me)"	Anthony Newley, Leslie Bricusse	4:05

== Personnel ==
Credits adapted from the extraneous booklet for the 2022 European release of Reality.

- James Brown – lead vocals

Studio band 1 ("Funky President")

- Jeanette Washington, Bobby Roach – backing vocals
- Jon Faddis, Marvin Stamm – trumpet
- David Sanborn – alto saxophone
- Joe Farrell – tenor saxophone
- Alfred "Pee Wee" Ellis – baritone saxophone
- Joe Beck, Sam Brown – electric guitar
- Wilbur Bascomb – bass guitar
- Allan Schwartzberg – drums

Tracks 4, 5, 8 and 9 are played by unidentified musicians.

Studio band 2 (remainder of titles)

- Burt Collins, Lew Soloff – trumpet
- Fred Wesley – trombone, tambourine, backing vocals
- Maceo Parker – alto saxophone
- Joe Farrell – tenor saxophone, flute
- Alfred "Pee Wee" Ellis – baritone saxophone
- Leon Pendarvis – clavinet
- Harry Lookofsky – conductor of unidentified string section
- Margaret Ross – harp
- Joe Beck, Sam Brown, Cornell Dupree – electric guitar
- Gordon Edwards – bass guitar
- Sue Evans – percussion
- Bob Both – tambourine, triangle
- probably Johnny Griggs – congas
- Jimmy Madison – drums

- David Matthews – arrangement ("Check Your Body", "The Twist")
- James Brown and Fred Wesley – arrangement (remainder of titles)
- Bob Both – audio engineer, production supervisor
- David Stone, Major Little – assistant engineer
- Don Brautigam – illustration
