= Funky Drummer =

1970 single by James Brown

"Funky Drummer (Part 1)"

Single by James Brown

from the album In the Jungle Groove
- B-side: "Funky Drummer (Part 2)"
- Released: March 1970
- Recorded: November 20, 1969
- Studio: King Studios, Cincinnati, Ohio
- Genre: Funk
- Length: 2:36 (Part 1); 2:55 (Part 2); 9:15 (album version)
- Label: King
- Songwriter: James Brown
- Producer: James Brown

James Brown charting singles chronology
"It's a New Day (Part 1) & (Part 2)" (1970)	"Funky Drummer (Part 1)" (1970)	"Brother Rapp (Part 1) & (Part 2)" (1970)

Audio sample
- file; help

Audio video
- "Funky Drummer (Pt. 1 & 2)" on YouTube

External videos
- Drummerworld – Stubblefield breakdown of "Cold Sweat" and "Funky Drummer".

"Funky Drummer" is a song by the American musician James Brown, recorded in 1969 and released as a single in 1970. Its drum break, improvised by Clyde Stubblefield, is one of the most frequently sampled recordings.

== Recording and composition ==
"Funky Drummer" was recorded on November 20, 1969, in Cincinnati, Ohio. It is an extended vamp, with individual instruments (mostly the guitar, tenor saxophones and organ) improvising brief licks on top. Brown's ad-libbed vocals are sporadic and declamatory, mostly concerned with encouraging the other band members. The song is played in the key of D minor, though the first verse is in C major.

As in the full-length version of "Cold Sweat", Brown announces the upcoming drum break, which comes late in the recording, requesting to "give the drummer some." He tells Stubblefield "You don't have to do no soloing, brother, just keep what you got... Don't turn it loose, 'cause it's a mother." Stubblefield's eight-bar unaccompanied "solo", a version of the riff he plays through most of the piece, is the result of Brown's directions; this break beat is one of the most sampled recordings in music.

After the drum break, the band returns to the original vamp. Brown, apparently impressed with what Stubblefield has produced, seems to name the song on the spot as it continues, and repeats it: "The name of this tune is 'The Funky Drummer', 'The Funky Drummer', 'The Funky Drummer'." The recording ends with a reprise of Stubblefield's solo and a fade-out.

== Release ==
"Funky Drummer" was originally released by King Records as a two-part 45 rpm single in March 1970. The difference between the album version and the single version is that the single version contains Brown's vocal percussion ('kooncha'). Despite rising to No. 20 on the R&B chart and No. 51 on the pop chart, it did not receive an album release until the 1986 compilation In the Jungle Groove.

More than one mix of "Funky Drummer" was made around the time it was recorded, including one with tambourine and another with vocal percussion by Brown and trombonist Fred Wesley. The most commonly heard version of the track lacks these elements, which were apparently overdubbed. In addition to the original version of "Funky Drummer", the album In the Jungle Groove includes a "bonus beat reprise" of the piece. This track, edited by Danny Krivit, consists of a 3-minute loop of the drum break, punctuated only by Brown's sampled vocal interjections and an occasional guitar chord and tambourine hit.

== Sampling ==
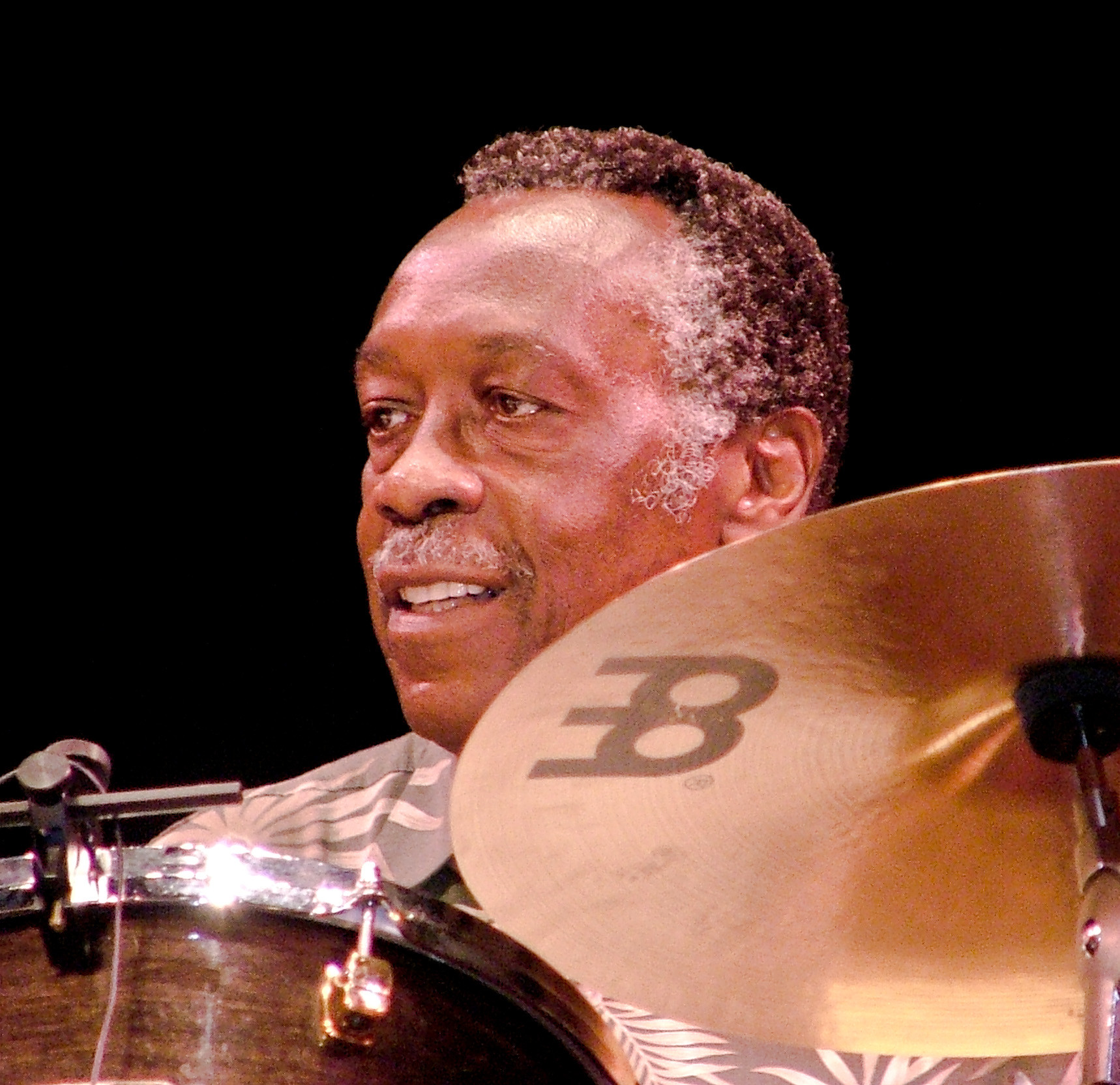
Stubblefield in 2005

"Funky Drummer" is one of the most widely sampled pieces of music. In 1986, the tracks "South Bronx", "Eric B. is President" and "It's a Demo" sampled Stubblefield's drum break, helping popularize sampling. The drum break was sampled by hip-hop acts including Public Enemy, N.W.A, LL Cool J, Run-DMC, the Beastie Boys, and used in the theme music to the animated series The Powerpuff Girls. Other musicians who have sampled it include Ed Sheeran and George Michael.

As Stubblefield did not receive a songwriter credit for "Funky Drummer", he received no royalties for the sampling. He told The New York Times in 2011: "It didn't bug me or disturb me, but I think it's disrespectful not to pay people for what they use." Stubblefield capitalized on the name with his 1997 album Revenge of the Funky Drummer.

== Personnel ==
- James Brown – vocals, Hammond organ

with the James Brown Orchestra

- Richard "Kush" Griffith – trumpet
- Joe Davis – trumpet
- Fred Wesley – trombone
- Maceo Parker – tenor saxophone
- Eldee Williams – tenor saxophone
- St. Clair Pinckney – baritone saxophone
- Jimmy Nolen – guitar
- Alphonso "Country" Kellum – guitar
- Charles Sherrell – bass guitar
- Clyde Stubblefield – drums

== Charts ==
Chart performance for "Funky Drummer"
Chart (1970)	Peak position
Canada Top Singles (RPM)	41
US Billboard Hot 100	51
US Billboard R&B	20
US Cash Box Top 100	37

== See also ==
- Amen break
- Think break, a similar widely-sampled drum break from "Think (About It)"
- "Funky President (People It's Bad)"
