= Revolution of the Mind: Live at the Apollo, Volume III =

Live album by James Brown
- Released: December 1971
- Recorded: July 24–26, 1971
- Venue: Apollo Theater, New York, NY
- Genre: Soul, funk
- Length: 62:08
- Label: Polydor
- Producer: James Brown

James Brown live albums chronology
Sex Machine (1970)	Revolution of the Mind: Live at the Apollo, Volume III (1971)	Hot on the One (1980)

Revolution of the Mind: Live at the Apollo, Volume III is a live double album by James Brown released in 1971. As its subtitle suggests, it is Brown's third album recorded at the Apollo Theater, following the original Live at the Apollo (1963) and Live at the Apollo, Volume II (1968).

After a triple album project recorded in France was cancelled because Brown had signed with a new label, Polydor, Brown instead recorded his shows at the Apollo in July 1971. Revolution of the Mind documented Brown during his full immersion into funk music with his revamped backing band, the J.B.'s.

The album is notable as the first of Brown's live albums to include a spoken introduction by his longtime master of ceremonies, Danny Ray.

I'd like to know, are you really ready for some super dynamite soul? Then thank you, 'cause now, it's star time! Introducing, ladies and gentlemen, the young man that's had over 35 soul classics. Among these classics are tunes that will never die - tunes like "Try Me" ... "Out of Sight" ... "Papa's Got a Brand New Bag" ... "I Feel Good" ... like a "Sex Machine" ... because you're "Super Bad" ... "Get Up, Get Into It, and Get Involved!" ... because you've got "Soul Power!" Introducing the world's greatest entertainer, Mr. Dynamite, the amazing Mr. Please Please himself, the hardest working man in show business, ladies and gentlemen, the star of our show, James Brown!

Revolution of the Mind peaked at No. 39 on the pop album chart and at No. 7 on the R&B chart.

== Track listing ==
Side A

1. "It's a New Day So Let a Man Come in and Do the Popcorn" (James Brown) - 3:47
2. "Bewildered" (Teddy Powell, Leonard Whitcup) - 7:55
3. "Get Up (I Feel Like Being a) Sex Machine" (James Brown, Bobby Byrd, Ron Lenhoff) - 5:05

Side B

1. "Escape-ism" (James Brown, David Matthews) - 3:04
2. "Make It Funky" (Charles Bobbit, James Brown) - 12:52

Side C

1. "Try Me" (James Brown) - 2:43
2. Fast Medley - 1:17
  - "I Can't Stand It"
  - "Mother Popcorn"
  - "I Got the Feelin'" (James Brown)
3. "Give It Up or Turnit a Loose" (Charles Bobbit) - 2:22
4. "Super Bad" (James Brown) - 4:22
5. "Get Up, Get into It, Get Involved" (James Brown, Bobby Byrd, Ron Lenhoff) - 3:23

Side D

1. "Get Up, Get into It, Get Involved" (James Brown, Bobby Byrd, Ron Lenhoff) (Part 2)- 4:55
2. "Soul Power" (James Brown) - 1:47
3. "Hot Pants (She Got to Use What She Got to Get What She Wants)" (James Brown, Fred Wesley) - 8:35

=== 1993 reissue ===
The track listing was amended to make note of the Danny Ray intro not mentioned on the original release, and a re-edit/re-tracking of the transition between "Get Up, Get Into It, Get Involved" and "Soul Power." / Liner notes mentioned that tracks 4 and 5 were actually opening numbers for the first live show of the July, 1971 weeklong gig.

1. Intro/"It's a New Day So Let a Man Come in and Do the Popcorn" (James Brown) - 3:47
2. "Bewildered" (Teddy Powell, Leonard Whitcup) - 7:55
3. "Get Up (I Feel Like Being a) Sex Machine" (James Brown, Bobby Byrd, Ron Lenhoff) - 5:05
4. "Escape-ism" (James Brown, David Matthews) - 3:04
5. "Make It Funky" (Charles Bobbit, James Brown) - 12:52
6. "Try Me" (James Brown) - 2:43
7. Fast Medley - 1:17
  - "I Can't Stand It"
  - "Mother Popcorn"
  - "I Got the Feelin'" (James Brown)
8. "Give It Up or Turnit a Loose" (Charles Bobbit) - 2:22
9. "Super Bad" (James Brown) - 4:22
10. "Get Up, Get into It, Get Involved" (James Brown, Bobby Byrd, Ron Lenhoff) - 3:21
11. "Soul Power" (James Brown) - 6:36
12. "Hot Pants (She Got to Use What She Got to Get What She Wants) (James Brown, Fred Wesley) - 8:35
