= People Get Up and Drive Your Funky Soul =

Single by James Brown

from the album Slaughter's Big Rip-Off
- A-side: "My Thang"
- Released: July 1973 (album); July 1974 (single)
- Recorded: April 18, 1973 – May 1973
- Studio: United Artists (Los Angeles, California)
- Genre: Soul; Funk
- Length: 3:40
- Label: Polydor; 2066 484
- Songwriters: James Brown; Fred Wesley; St. Clair Pinckney
- Producer: James Brown

James Brown singles chronology
"The Payback" (1974)	"People Get Up and Drive Your Funky Soul" (1973)	"Papa Don't Take No Mess" (1974)

Audio video
- "People Get Up And Drive Your Funky Soul (Remix)" on YouTube

"People Get Up and Drive Your Funky Soul" is a song written by James Brown, Fred Wesley and St. Clair Pinckney and recorded by Brown. The song appears in the film Slaughter's Big Rip-Off and was first released on the film's soundtrack album in July 1973, as well as being used as the B-side to the European release of "My Thang". An extended version of the song was released on the Motherlode album in 1988.

The song is featured in the 2007 film Spider-Man 3 during a scene where Peter Parker (portrayed by Tobey Maguire) acts pompously under the effects of the Venom symbiote. Maguire's dancing during this scene would become a popular GIF as well as spur on the "Bully Maguire" internet meme.

== Personnel ==
- James Brown – vocals
- Cat Anderson, Eugene "Snooky" Young – trumpet
- Benny Powell – trombone
- Ernie Watts – tenor saxophone
- Joe Sample – electric piano
- David T. Walker – electric guitar
- Chuck Rainey – bass guitar
- Harvey Mason or Leon "Ndugu" Chancler – drums
- Fred Wesley, James Brown – arrangers
- James Brown – producer
