= Sex Machine Today =

Studio album by James Brown
- Released: March 1975
- Recorded: January 4 – March 1, 1975
- Studios: A & R Studios (New York City, New York); Sound Ideas Studios (New York City, New York)
- Genre: Funk
- Length: 39:45
- Labels: Polydor; 6042
- Producer: Charles Bobbit

James Brown chronology
Reality (1974)	Sex Machine Today (1975)	Everybody's Doin' the Hustle & Dead on the Double Bump (1975)

Singles from Sex Machine Today
- 1. "Sex Machine" Released: March 24, 1975; 2. "Dead On It" Released: June 1975

Professional ratings
Review scores
Source	Rating
AllMusic	1/5 stars
Robert Christgau	C+
The Rolling Stone Album Guide	2/5 stars

Sex Machine Today is the 40th studio album by American musician James Brown. The album was released in March 1975, by Polydor Records.

== Track listing ==
No.	Title	Writer(s)	Length
1.	"Sex Machine, Pts. 1 & 2"	James Brown, Bobby Byrd, Ron Lenhoff	12:05
2.	"I Feel Good"	James Brown	3:05
3.	"Problems"	Brown, Lee Austin	2:45
4.	"Dead on It"	Brown, Fred Wesley	13:10
5.	"Get Up Off of Me"	Brown, Wesley	3:56
6.	"Deep in It"	Brown	4:44

== Personnel ==
=== Musicians ===
- James Brown – lead vocals, clavinet

==== The J.B.'s ====
"Sex Machine". "I Feel Good", "Dead On It"

- Russell Crimes – trumpet
- Fred Wesley – trombone
- Maceo Parker, Jimmy Parker – alto saxophone
- St. Clair Pinckney – tenor saxophone
- Jimmy Nolen, Hearlon "Cheese" Martin – electric guitar
- “Sweet” Charles Sherrell – bass guitar, clavinet
- Fred Thomas – bass guitar
- Johnny Griggs – percussion
- John “Jabo” Starks, John Morgan – drums

==== Studio band arranged by James Brown ====
"Problems"

- Maeretha Stewart, Hilda Harris, Tasha Thomas – backing vocals
- Lew Soloff, Marvin Stamm – trumpet
- Fred Wesley – trombone
- probably Maceo Parker – alto saxophone
- Joe Farrell – tenor saxophone
- Alfred "Pee Wee" Ellis – baritone saxophone
- Leon Pendarvis – clavinet
- Joe Beck, Cornell Dupree – electric guitar
- Wilbur Bascomb – bass guitar
- Jimmy Madison – drums
- Joe Beck – overdubbed electric guitar ("Sex Machine")

=== Technical ===
- Fred Wesley – arrangements
- Fred Wesley – production supervision, arrangements
- Bob Both – production supervision, engineer
- David Stone, Major Little – assistant engineer
- Roger Huyssen – artwork==References==
