= Hot (James Brown album) =

Studio album by James Brown
- Released: January 1976
- Recorded: January 21, 1974 – September 1975
- Studio: Sound Ideas Studios (New York City, New York); A & R Studios (New York City, New York); Wally Heider Studios (San Francisco, California); International Studios (Augusta, Georgia)
- Genre: Funk
- Length: 42:43
- Label: Polydor; 6059
- Producer: James Brown

James Brown chronology
Everybody's Doin' the Hustle & Dead on the Double Bump (1975)	Hot (1976)	Get Up Offa That Thing (1976)

Singles from Hot
- 1. "Hot (I Need to Be Loved, Loved, Loved)" Released: November 1975; 2. "(I Love You) For Sentimental Reasons / Goodnight My Love" Released: November 1975

Professional ratings
Review scores
Source	Rating
AllMusic	3/5 stars
Robert Christgau	B
The Rolling Stone Album Guide	3/5 stars

Hot is the 42nd studio album by American musician James Brown. The album was released in January of 1976 by Polydor Records.

== Track listing ==
All tracks are written by James Brown; except where indicated.

No.	Title	Writer(s)	Length
1.	"Hot (I Need to Be Loved, Loved, Loved, Loved)"		5:56
2.	"So Long"	Irving Melsher, Remus Harris, Russ Morgan	3:20
3.	"(I Love You) For Sentimental Reasons"	Deek Watson, William Best	3:48
4.	"Try Me"		5:41
5.	"The Future Shock of the World"		4:07
6.	"Woman"		3:45
7.	"Most of All"	Hank Thompson	4:00
8.	"Goodnight My Love"	Gus Arnheim, Harry Tobias, Jules Lemare	5:08
9.	"Please, Please, Please"		6:54

== Personnel ==
=== Musicians ===
- James Brown – lead vocals, backing vocals
- Bobby Byrd, Sylvester Keels – backing vocals
- Fred Wesley – trombone, backing vocals

==== The J.B.'s ====
"The Future Shock of the World"

- Russell Crimes – trumpet
- Maceo Parker, Jimmy Parker – alto saxophone
- St. Clair Pinckney – tenor saxophone
- "Sweet" Charles Sherrell – clavinet
- Jimmy Nolen, Hearlon "Cheese" Martin – electric guitar
- Fred Thomas – bass guitar
- Johnny Griggs – percussion
- probably John Morgan – drums

==== Studio band conducted by David Matthews ====
"Hot (I Need To Be Loved, Loved, Loved, Loved", "(I Love You) For Sentimental Reasons", "Goodnight My Love"

- Randy Brecker – trumpet
- David Sanborn – alto saxophone
- Michael Brecker – tenor saxophone
- Leon Pendarvis – electric piano
- Corky Hale, Margaret Ross – harp
- Joe Beck, John Tropea, Duncan Cleary, Sam Brown – electric guitar
- Will Lee, Gordon Edwards – bass guitar
- Sue Evans – congas, percussion
- Steve Gadd, Jimmy Madison – drums

=== Technical ===
- James Brown, David Matthews – arrangements
- Bob Both – recording supervisor, engineer
- David Stone, Major Little – engineer
- Michael Doret – artwork
