= Ain't It Funky =

Studio album by James Brown
- Released: January 1970
- Recorded: May 1967 – October 14, 1969
- Studios: King Studios (Cincinnati, Ohio); Criteria Studios (Miami, Florida); RCA Studios (Los Angeles, California)
- Genres: Rhythm and blues; Funk; soul
- Length: 37:06
- Labels: King; 1092
- Producer: James Brown

James Brown chronology
It's a Mother (1969)	Ain't It Funky (1970)	Soul on Top (1970)

Singles from Ain't It Funky
- 1. "Give It Up or Turnit a Loose" Released: January 1969; 2. "Ain't It Funky Now" Released: November 1969

Professional ratings
Review scores
Source	Rating
AllMusic	2/5 stars
The Rolling Stone Album Guide	2.5/5 stars

Ain't It Funky is the 27th full-length studio album by American musician James Brown. The album was recorded between 1966 and 1969 and originally released in January 1970. Much of the album is previously James Brown produced material with Kenny Poole's guitar replacing the vocal track.

Use Your Mother, which itself was an instrumental remix of the yet unreleased You Got To Have A Mother For Me, was used as the instrumental for Bobby Byrd's I Need Help. After You Done It samples Marva Whitney's I Made A Mistake Because It's Only You, which was produced by James Brown.

== Chart performance ==
Ain't It Funky was the first of 4 albums Brown released in 1970, and it remained the highest-chart one. The album debuted on Billboard magazine's Top LP's chart in the issue dated February 14, 1970, peaking at No. 43 during a twelve-week run on the chart. The album entered Cashbox magazine's Top 100 Albums chart in the issue dated February 21, 1970, peaking at No. 71 during a seven-week run on it. The album did much better on the Best-Selling Soul LPs chart published by Billboard, where it reached No. 5 in March 1970.

== Track listing ==
Side A
No.	Title	Writer(s)	Length
1.	"Ain't It Funky Now, Pts. 1-2"	Brown	9:26
2.	"Fat Wood, Pts. 1-2"	Brown, Jimmy Nolen	9:15
Total length:			17:46

Side B
No.	Title	Writer(s)	Length
3.	"Cold Sweat"	Brown, Pee Wee Ellis	5:17
4.	"Give It Up or Turnit a Loose"	Charles Bobbit	3:45
5.	"Nose Job"	Brown, Bud Hobgood	2:30
6.	"Use Your Mother"	Brown	3:25
7.	"After You Done It"	Brown	3:28
Total length:			18:07

== Personnel ==
- James Brown – lead vocals, organ
- Richard "Kush" Griffith, Joe Davis – trumpet
- Fred Wesley – trombone
- Maceo Parker, Eldee Williams – tenor saxophone
- St. Clair Pinckney – baritone saxophone
- Jimmy Nolen, Alfonzo Kellum – guitar
- Sweet Charles Sherrell – bass
- Clyde Stubblefield, Jabo Starks – drums

Overdubs ("Cold Sweat", "Give It Up or Turnit a Loose", "Use Your Mother", "After You Done It")

- Kenny Poole – guitar

== Charts ==
Chart peaks for Ain't It Funky
Chart (1970)	Peak position
US Billboard Top LPs	43
US Billboard Best-Selling Soul LPs	5
US Cashbox Top 100 Albums	71
