= Mind Power =

Mind Power may refer to:

- "Mind Power", a song by James Brown on the 1973 album The Payback
- A former name (1976-77) of the band Bad Brains
