= The Payback =

Studio album by James Brown
- Released: December 1973
- Recorded: Early February 1973 – October 2, 1973
- Studios: Rodel Studios (Washington, D.C.); United Studios (Los Angeles, California); International Studios (Augusta, Georgie); Advantage Studios (New York City, New York)
- Genre: Funk
- Length: 72:52
- Labels: Polydor; 3007
- Producer: James Brown

James Brown chronology
Slaughter's Big Rip-Off (1973)	The Payback (1973)	Hell (1974)

Singles from The Payback
- 1. "Stoned to the Bone" Released: October 1973; 2. "The Payback" Released: February 1974

Professional ratings
Review scores
Source	Rating
AllMusic	4.5/5 stars
Robert Christgau	B+
eMusic	5/5 stars
The Rolling Stone Album Guide	3/5 stars

The Payback is the 37th studio album by the American musician James Brown. Originally slated to serve as the soundtrack for the 1973 blaxploitation film Hell Up in Harlem, it was ultimately not used for that film and instead released as a separate album in December 1973 by Polydor Records.

The Payback is considered a high point in Brown's recording career, and is regarded by critics as a landmark funk album. Its revenge-themed title track, a #1 Billboard R&B hit, is one of Brown's most famous songs, and has been frequently sampled.

== Background ==
A widely repeated story—including by James Brown himself—that Hell Up in Harlem director Larry Cohen rejected the album as "not funky enough" for the film is denied by Cohen. On the DVD commentary track for Cohen's Black Caesar (to which Hell Up in Harlem is a sequel), Cohen states that executives at American International Pictures were already unhappy with Brown for delivering songs much longer than expected on his Black Caesar and Slaughter's Big Rip-Off soundtracks and opted for a deal with Edwin Starr and Motown Records instead. Cohen said the absence of Brown's music from Harlem still "breaks [his] heart."

The Payback was a success, topping the Billboard Soul Albums chart for two weeks and peaking at number 34 on the Billboard 200 album chart. It was Brown's only studio album to be certified gold by the Recording Industry Association of America.

The Payback largely features cyclic funk grooves and extensive instrumental jamming, but it also contains the softer soul-based ballads "Doing the Best I Can" and "Forever Suffering".

The album was reissued on CD in 1992 with liner notes by Alan Leeds.

== Track listing ==
All tracks are written by James Brown, Fred Wesley, and Charles Bobbit, except where noted.

Side A
No.	Title	Writer(s)	Length
1.	"The Payback"	Brown, Wesley, John "Jabo" Starks	7:39
2.	"Doing the Best I Can"		7:42
Total length:			15:23

Side B
No.	Title	Writer(s)	Length
3.	"Take Some...Leave Some"		8:33
4.	"Shoot Your Shot"	Brown	8:09
Total length:			16:45

Side C
No.	Title	Length
5.	"Forever Suffering"	5:52
6.	"Time Is Running out Fast"	12:47
Total length:		18:41

Side D
No.	Title	Writer(s)	Length
7.	"Stone to the Bone"	Brown	10:14
8.	"Mind Power"		12:04
Total length:			22:27

== Personnel ==
- James Brown – lead vocals, electric piano, electric organ
- Martha High – backing vocals
- Isiah "Ike" Oakley – trumpet
- Darryl "Hasaan" Jamison – trumpet
- Jerone "Jasaan" Sanford – trumpet
- Maceo Parker – alto saxophone, flute
- St. Clair Pinckney – tenor saxophone, flute
- Fred Wesley – trombone
- Jimmy Nolen – electric guitar
- Hearlon "Cheese" Martin – electric guitar
- Fred Thomas – bass guitar
- "Sweet" Charles Sherrell – bass guitar
- John Morgan – cabasa, tambourine, rainstick
- Johnny Griggs – congas
- John "Jabo" Starks – drums

== Charts ==
Album – Billboard (North America)

Year	Chart	Position
1974	Billboard Pop Albums	34

== Certifications ==
Region	Certification	Certified units/sales
United States (RIAA)	Gold	500,000^{^}
^{^} Shipments figures based on certification alone.

== See also ==
- List of number-one R&B albums of 1974 (U.S.)
