= She's the One (Hank Ballard song) =

Single by The Midnighters

Single by The Midnighters
- A-side: "Annie Had a Baby"
- Released: 1954
- Genre: Rhythm and blues
- Length: 2:13
- Label: Federal; 12195
- Songwriter: Hank Ballard

"He's the One"

Single by Ike & Tina Turner
- B-side: "Chicken Shack"
- Released: Dec 1964
- Genre: Rhythm and blues
- Length: 2:05
- Label: Kent; 418
- Songwriter: Hank Ballard

Ike & Tina Turner singles chronology
"Ooh Poo Pah Doo" (1964)	"He's the One" (1964)	"Tell Her I'm Not Home" (1965)

"He's the One"

Single by Marva Whitney

from the album It's My Thing
- B-side: "This Girls in Love with You"
- Released: January 1970
- Genre: Rhythm and blues, soul
- Length: 2:48
- Label: King; 6283
- Songwriters: Hank Ballard; James Brown
- Producer: James Brown

"She's the One"

Single by James Brown

from the album Motherlode
- B-side: "Funky President (People It's Bad)"
- Released: 1988
- Recorded: November 20, 1969, King Studios, Cincinnati, OH
- Genre: Rhythm and blues, soul
- Length: 2:59
- Label: Urban; 13
- Songwriters: Hank Ballard; James Brown
- Producer: James Brown

James Brown singles chronology singles chronology
"How Do You Stop" (1987)	"She's the One" (1988)	"The Payback Mix" (1988)

Audio video
- "She's The One" on YouTube

"She's the One" is a rhythm and blues song written by Hank Ballard and first recorded by his group The Midnighters. Originally issued on Federal Records as the B-side of their #1 R&B hit "Annie Had a Baby", it received an A-side release (Federal 12205) later the same year.

Ike & Tina Turner recorded a version of the song, retitled "He's the One" which was released as a single in 1964 and included on the 2000 compilation album The Kent Years. Marva Whitney recorded a version of "He's the One", for her James Brown-produced 1969 album It's My Thing. Her version was released as a single the following year.

Brown himself recorded the song around the same time, but his version remained unreleased until 1988, when it was issued as a single in the United Kingdom and peaked at number 45 in the UK Singles Chart. It also appeared on the compilation album Motherlode, released the same year.
