= It's a New Day – Let a Man Come In =

Studio album by James Brown
- Released: June 1970
- Recorded: October 29, 1968 – January 4, 1970
- Studio: Criteria Studios (Miami, Florida); King Studios (Cincinnati, Ohio); Paramount Studios (Los Angeles, California); Harmony Studios (Los Angeles, California); United Studios (Los Angeles, California)
- Genre: Funk
- Length: 39:06
- Label: King; 1095
- Producer: James Brown

James Brown chronology
Soul on Top (1970)	It's a New Day – Let a Man Come In (1970)	Sex Machine (1970)

Singles from It's a New Day – Let a Man Come In
- 1. "Give It Up or Turnit a Loose" Released: January 1969; 2. "World" Released: August 1969; 3. "Let a Man Come In and Do the Popcorn" Released: October 1969; 4. "Part Two (Let a Man Come In and Do the Popcorn)" Released: October 1969; 5. "It's A New Day (Part 1) & (Part 2) / Georgia on My Mind" Released: January 1970

Professional ratings
Review scores
Source	Rating
AllMusic	3/5 stars
The Rolling Stone Album Guide	4.5/5 stars

It's a New Day – Let a Man Come In is the 29th studio album by American musician James Brown. The album was released in June 1970, by King Records.

== Chart performance ==
The album debuted on Billboard magazine's Top LP's chart in the issue dated July 4, 1970, peaking at No. 121 during a six-week run on the chart.

== Track listing ==
All tracks are written by James Brown; except where indicated.

No.	Title	Writer(s)	Length
1.	"It's a New Day, Pts. 1 & 2"		5:54
2.	"Let a Man Come In and Do the Popcorn, Pts. 1 & 2"		7:10
3.	"World, Pts. 1 & 2"		6:08
4.	"Georgia On My Mind"	Hoagy Carmichael, Stuart Gorrell	4:18
5.	"It's a Man's Man's Man's World"		2:55
6.	"Give It Up or Turnit a Loose"	Charles Bobbit	2:48
7.	"If I Ruled the World"	Cyril Ornadel, Leslie Bricusse	4:04
8.	"The Man in the Glass, Pt. 1"	Bud Hobgood	2:51
9.	"I'm Not Demanding, Pt. 1"	James Brown, Bud Hobgood	2:58

== Personnel ==
- James Brown – lead vocals
- Bobby Byrd – backing vocals
- Richard "Kush" Griffith, Joe Davis – trumpet
- Fred Wesley – trombone
- Pee Wee Ellis – alto saxophone
- Maceo Parker, Eldee Williams – tenor saxophone
- St. Clair Pinckney – baritone saxophone
- Jimmy Nolen, Alfonzo Kellum – guitar
- Sweet Charles Sherrell – bass
- Melvin Parker, Nate Jones – drums

== Charts ==
Chart (1970)	Peak position
US Billboard Top LPs	121
