= Love, Power, Peace: Live at the Olympia, Paris, 1971 =

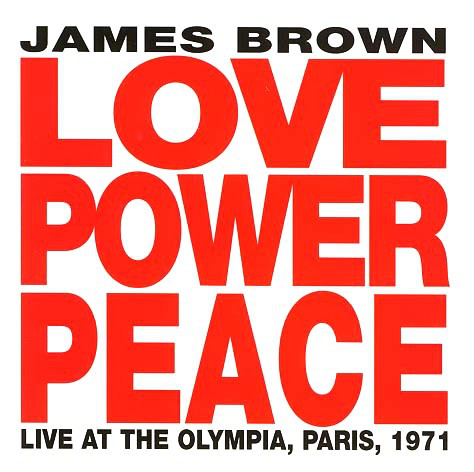

Live album by James Brown
- Released: August 23, 1992
- Recorded: March 8, 1971
- Venue: Olympia, Paris, France
- Genre: Funk
- Length: 64:40
- Label: Polydor
- Producer: James Brown; Harry Weinger

James Brown live albums chronology
Soul Session Live (1989)	Love, Power, Peace: Live at the Olympia, Paris, 1971 (1992)	Live at the Apollo 1995 (1995)

Professional ratings
Review scores
Source	Rating
Allmusic	4.5/5 stars

Love, Power, Peace: Live at the Olympia, Paris, 1971 is a live album by James Brown. It is the only recording that documents one of his live performances with the original J.B.'s lineup featuring Bootsy and Catfish Collins. (The group's contributions to the ostensibly all-live Sex Machine album were actually recorded in the studio.) Love, Power, Peace was originally intended for a 1972 release as a vinyl triple album, but was cancelled after the key members of the original J.B.'s left Brown to join Parliament-Funkadelic. The album was released on CD in an edited version in 1992; the full show, using Brown's original mixdown was later released in July 2014 on Sundazed Music.

== Track listing ==
All tracks composed by James Brown except where indicated

=== Original 1971 sequencing ===
Side A

1. "Introduction" – 4:36
2. "Brother Rapp" – 3:02
3. "Ain't It Funky Now" – 5:35
4. "Georgia on My Mind – Part I" – 2:45

Side B

1. "Georgia on My Mind – Part II" – 3:14
2. "Sunny" – 3:50
3. "Introduction" – 0:49
4. "Signed, Sealed and Delivered" (Bobby Byrd) – 2:10
5. "I Need Help (I Can't Do It Alone)" (Bobby Byrd) – 6:04

Side C

1. "Intro" (Bobby Byrd) – 0:46
2. "Don’t Play That Song (You Lied)" (Vicki Anderson) – 2:59
3. "Yesterday" (Vicki Anderson) – 3:26
4. "Break and Intro Announcement" – 2:19
5. "Dance & It's A New Day" – 2:50
6. "Bewildered – Part I" – 3:04

Side D

1. "Bewildered – Part II" – 2:47
2. "There Was a Time" – 2:16
3. "Sex Machine" – 8:39
4. "Try Me – Part I" – 2:02

Side E

1. "Try Me – Part II" – 0:12
2. "Papa's Got a Brand New Bag / I Got You (I Feel Good) / I Got The Feelin'" – 1:29
3. "Give It Up or Turnit a Loose" – 5:21
4. "It's a Man's Man's Man's World" – 5:53
5. "Who Am I" – 4:08

Side F

1. "Please Please Please" – 2:06
2. "Sex Machine (Reprise)" – 0:38
3. "Super Bad" – 5:05
4. "Get Up, Get Into It, Get Involved" – 2:07
5. "Soul Power" – 4:22
6. "Get Up, Get Into It, Get Involved (Reprise)" – 2:26
7. "Finale" – 0:52

=== 1992 mix ===
1. "Intro" – 1:12
2. "Brother Rapp" – 3:03
3. "Ain't It Funky Now" – 5:36
4. "Georgia on My Mind" (Hoagy Carmichael, Stuart Gorrell) – 6:11
5. "It's a New Day" – 2:52
6. "Bewildered" (Teddy Powell, Leonard Whitcup) – 4:19
7. Sex Machine (Brown, Bobby Byrd, Ron Lenhoff) – 8:45
8. "Try Me" – 2:19
9. "Medley: Papa's Got A Brand New Bag/I Got You (I Feel Good)/I Got The Feelin'" – 1:29
10. "Give It Up Or Turnit A Loose" (Charles Bobbit) – 5:14
11. "It's A Man's Man's Man's World" (Brown, Betty Jean Newsome) – 5:43
12. "Please Please Please" (Brown, Johnny Terry) – 2:08
13. "Sex Machine (reprise)" (Brown, Byrd, Lenhoff) – 0:39
14. "Super Bad" – 5:07
15. "Get Up, Get Into It, Get Involved" (Brown, Byrd, Lenhoff) – 2:07
16. "Soul Power" – 4:24
17. "Get Up, Get Into It, Get Involved (finale)" (Brown, Byrd, Lenhoff) – 3:33

== Personnel ==
- James Brown – vocals, organ
- Bobby Byrd – MC, vocals, organ
- Darryl "Hasaan" Jamison – trumpet
- Clayton "Chicken" Gunnells – trumpet
- Fred Wesley – trombone
- St. Clair Pinckney – tenor saxophone
- Phelps "Catfish" Collins – lead guitar
- Hearlon "Cheese" Martin – rhythm guitar
- William "Bootsy" Collins – bass guitar
- John "Jabo" Starks – drums
- Don Juan "Tiger" Martin – drums
- David Matthews – director of additional horns, strings
