= Hell (James Brown album) =

Studio album by James Brown
- Released: June 28, 1974
- Recorded: August 23, 1973 – May 1974
- Studio: International Studios (Augusta, Georgia); A & R Studios (New York City, New York); United Artists Studios (Los Angeles, California); Sound Ideas Studios (New York City, New York)
- Genre: Funk; Soul
- Length: 68:20
- Label: Polydor; 2-9001
- Producer: James Brown

James Brown chronology
The Payback (1973)	Hell (1974)	Reality (1974)

Singles from Hell
- 1. "My Thang" Released: June 1974; 2. "Papa Don't Take No Mess" Released: August 1974; 3. "Coldblooded" Released: October 1974

Hell (sometimes referred to as It's Hell) is the 38th studio album by American musician James Brown. The album was released on June 28, 1974, by Polydor Records.

Professional ratings
Review scores
Source	Rating
AllMusic	4.5/5 stars
Robert Christgau	B
Džuboks	unfavorable
Rolling Stone	favorable
The Rolling Stone Album Guide	4/5 stars

== Track listing ==
Side A
No.	Title	Writer(s)	Length
1.	"Coldblooded"	James Brown	4:45
2.	"Hell"	Brown	5:03
3.	"My Thang"	Brown	4:20
4.	"Sayin' It and Doin' It"	Brown	3:05
5.	"Please, Please, Please" (Remake)	Brown, John Terry	4:07

Side B
No.	Title	Writer(s)	Length
1.	"When the Saints Go Marchin' In"	Traditional; arranged by David Matthews	2:43
2.	"These Foolish Things (Remind Me of You)"	Harry Link, Holt Marvell, Jack Strachey	3:14
3.	"Stormy Monday"	T-Bone Walker	3:15
4.	"A Man Has to Go Back to the Cross Road Before He Finds Himself" (Remake)	Brown	2:52
5.	"Sometime" (Remake)	Brown, Bud Hobgood	4:15

Side C
No.	Title	Writer(s)	Length
1.	"I Can't Stand It '76'" (Remake)	Brown	8:10
2.	"Lost Someone" (Remake)	Brown, Bobby Byrd, Lloyd Stallworth	3:35
3.	"Don't Tell a Lie about Me and I Won't Tell the Truth on You"	Brown, J. Maloy Roach	5:05

Side D
No.	Title	Writer(s)	Length
1.	"Papa Don't Take No Mess"	Charles Bobbit, Brown, John Starks, Fred Wesley	13:51

== Personnel ==
- James Brown – lead vocals, electric organ, piano, synthesizer

The J.B.'s arranged by James Brown (Tracks A1, A2, C1, D1)

- Lyn Collins, Martha High – backing vocals
- Isiah "Ike" Oakley – trumpet
- Fred Wesley – trombone, tambourine
- Maceo Parker, Jimmy Parker – alto saxophone
- St. Clair Pinckney – tenor saxophone
- Jimmy Nolen, Hearlon "Cheese" Martin – electric guitar
- Fred Thomas, "Sweet" Charles Sherrell – bass guitar
- Johnny Griggs – congas
- John Morgan – percussion, drums
- John "Jabo" Starks – drums

Studio band arranged by David Matthews (Tracks A3, B1, B2, B3, B4, B5, C3)

- Hilda Harris, Debbie McDuffie, Maeretha Stewart, Fred Wesley, Bobby Roach, Johnny Scotton – backing vocals
- Jon Faddis, Lou Soloff – trumpet
- Michael Gibson, Tom Harrell – trombone
- David Sanborn – alto saxophone
- Joe Farrell, Frank Vicari – tenor saxophone
- Alfred "Pee Wee" Ellis – baritone saxophone
- Jimmy Buffington – french horn
- Joe Farrell, Eddie Daniels, David Tofani – reed
- David Matthews – piano
- Gene Orloff – concertmaster for unknown string section
- Joe Beck, Sam Brown, Charlie Brown – electric guitar
- Gordon Edwards – bass guitar
- Bob Both – tambourine
- Sue Evans – agogô, brushes
- Ralph McDonald – percussion
- Jimmy Madison – drums

Tracks A4, A5 and C2 feature unidentified studio bands arranged by James Brown.
