= Sexy, Sexy, Sexy =

1973 single by James Brown

Single by James Brown

from the album Slaughter's Big Rip-Off
- Released: 1973
- Genre: Funk
- Length: 3:11
- Label: Polydor
- Songwriter: James Brown
- Producer: James Brown

James Brown singles chronology
"Think" (1973)	"Sexy, Sexy, Sexy" (1973)	"Stoned to the Bone" (1973)

"Sexy, Sexy, Sexy" is a 1973 song written and recorded by James Brown, for the film Slaughter's Big Rip-Off. The song appeared on the film's soundtrack, and was released as a single in 1973. The song, and wider album, emerged from an era which saw the rise of blaxploitation films. Such films represented the struggle of African Americans against poverty and crime under a white-dominated society. While "Sexy, Sexy, Sexy" was received well by contemporary and modern audiences alike, it received negative reviews from critics. Brown used the same backing track and chord progression from his 1966 hit "Money Won't Change You" when composing the song, which prompted a poor critical response. Despite Brown's reuse of his earlier work, "Sexy, Sexy, Sexy" showcased the typical funk hallmarks of his more popular work. The song performed strongly on three separate Billboard charts as well as the Cashbox chart. It appeared in three separate releases under music label Polydor Records and reissued in 2020.

== Background ==
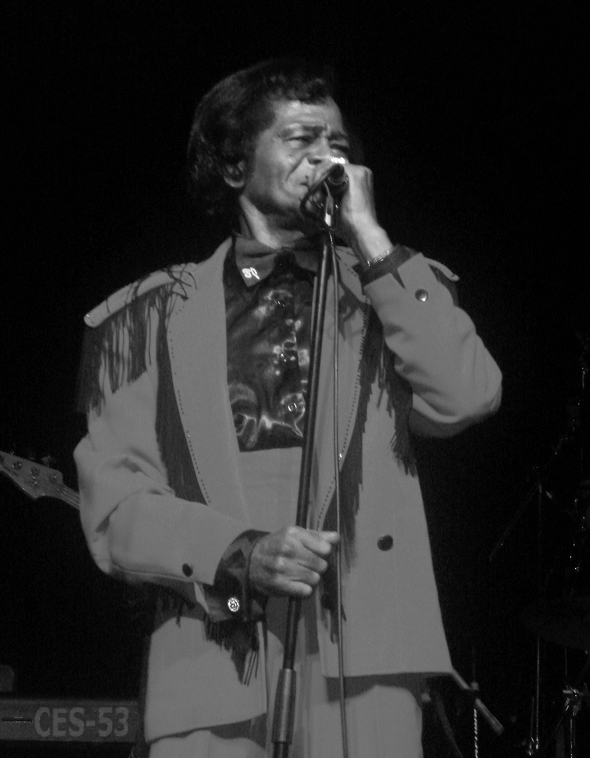
James Brown in concert

In the early 1970s the United States saw the rise of ethnic blaxploitation films focussed on the contemporary experience and oppression of African Americans. The films pioneered the use of original funk and soul soundtrack albums composed specifically for the films by prolific African American artists of the era. By using famous black composers of the 1960s and 1970s, the films showcased the musical and cinematic capabilities of African American creators. The soundtracks utilized defining conventions of soul, blues and funk music to encapsulate both the spirit as well as the struggle of African American communities against overbearing white authorities. Examples of such soundtracks and artists include Curtis Mayfield's Super Fly, Isaac Hayes in Shaft, and Earth, Wind & Fire for Sweet Sweetback's Baadasssss Song. James Brown was approached to author the soundtracks for two blaxploitation films. The first being Black Caesar, a 1973 remake of the 1931 film Little Caesar, revamped to represent the current African American experience. The film introduced Brown to his first experience in writing musical material in the form of a cinematic score. Brown wrote ten songs and performed on all tracks for the album, with assistance from Charles Bobbit and Fred Wesley.

Brown's second effort at score composure was in 1973 when he wrote the soundtrack for Slaughter's Big Rip-Off. The film was the sequel to the 1972 film, Slaughter. Both films focus on the titular character of Slaughter, a Vietnam veteran who struggles against the organized crime of Los Angeles. Hall of Fame footballer, Jim Brown, plays Slaughter in both films of the franchise. James Brown wrote and performed on all of the album's thirteen songs. It is from this album that "Sexy, Sexy, Sexy" was released as a single.

== Critical reception ==
Upon its release, the album and song received a poor critical response. The song's reception was contrary to the typically favorable reviews received by blaxploitation film soundtracks by other soul artists. Unlike Slaughter's Big Rip-Off, both Hayes' Shaft and Mayfield's Superfly were considered breakthrough original film compositions. In a highly critical piece on Brown's work, AllMusic reviewer Jason Elias labelled the single a "shocker". He rated the wider album two-and-a-half stars out of five, emphasizing its mediocrity. Elias argued that "Sexy, Sexy, Sexy" proved Brown would never be recognized as a soundtrack innovator. He largely criticized the song for using the exact backing track, chord progression and vocal line of his earlier hit "Money Won't Change You", which was released seven years prior in 1966. However, Elias does concede that the re-packaging of Brown's older hit single does work well in the context of the film.

Likewise, in a lukewarm review of Brown's work, Robert Christgau rated the album as a C. He criticized the album as being a "medium sized rip-off of a movie score". Similar to Elias, Christgau believed that Brown's venture into cinematic authorship had been rather underwhelming. However, the review does highlight "Sexy, Sexy, Sexy" as a single worth hearing from the otherwise mediocre album.

== Composition ==
"Sexy, Sexy, Sexy" is essentially an identical reconstruction of Brown's earlier 1966 hit single, "Money Won't Change You". Both songs have the exact same chord progression and backing track, however the latter song has a slightly quicker tempo, more aggressive vocals and new lyrics written for Slaughter's Big Rip-Off. "Sexy, Sexy, Sexy" is not the only song Brown reworked from his earlier catalogue. The soundtrack's "Happy for the Poor" is a Latin-styled version of his earlier 1971 "Gimme Some More", written during his time in The J.B.'s. Likewise, the soundtrack also included his earlier composition of "Brother Rapp". The song closely follows typical conventions of the funk and soul genres. A hallmark of funk music is a strong rhythmic section, which creates a dance, party-like vibe. Brown follows this archetype by utilizing an upbeat, erratic beat created by percussion and brass instruments. Likewise, by emphasizing the downbeat Brown establishes a strong groove. The use of a groove was pioneered by Brown in the mid-1960s, and helped define the wider genre of funk in the proceeding decade.

A second important convention of funk, utilized by the song, are powerful, intense and provocative vocals. "Sexy Sexy Sexy" is largely centered on Brown's trademark charismatic vocals. Common in funk songs is the use of primal vocal noises such as yelling, shouting or screaming. Brown's song begins with a single, sustained full body note created by a controlled scream. Proceeding the scream, the song breaks into the driving repetitive vocal lines. Throughout the song, Brown continually grunts and moans, imitating sexual noises and sounds. While the song has no definable chorus it involves many instances where Brown repeatedly sings "sexy" to establish a common theme and hook.

The song also incorporates brass, woodwind instruments and a Hammond organ to help create the song's melody.

== Lyrics ==
While, in terms of instrumentation and rhythm, "Sexy, Sexy, Sexy" is almost entirely identical to Brown's earlier hit "Money Won't Change You", the lyrics were rewritten to fit the context of the film. As with the instrumentation, the lyrics reflect the conventions of funk music, which Brown himself pioneered. The song was written to emphasize the sexual characterization of the film's key female figure, Marcia, Slaughter's girlfriend. Brown wrote the lyrics to sexualize Marcia, in accordance with the film's portrayal of female characters as hyper-sexual beings. While the song has no chorus, it constantly repeats the word "sexy" when describing the feminine subject matter. Likewise, Brown continues to cast Marcia in a sexual light by stating that Slaughter does "not turn off the lights to watch her dress". Hence, the song's lyrics reflect the hypersexualized nature of Brown's wider catalogue and funk songs of the era.

Another key feature of the song's lyrics is the use of bestial imagery to metaphorically describe the sex drive of both the male and female characters. Again, the use of animal imagery to represent the sexual nature of the subject matter is a typical aspect of the funk genre. Brown refers to the female mouth as "chicken lips". Likewise, he contrasts the full-bodied figure of Marcia's frame to a "bone". Likewise, he compares a dog burying a bone, "because he doesn't want it", to a male sexual partner preferring women with "giant hips". Both descriptions serve to hyperbolically describe both the sexual preferences of the main characters, and their attractive features.

Finally, the song uses terms and vernacular familiar to the African American experience. Again, the use of black colloquialisms is a typical hallmark of 1960s funk music. Brown refers to the female subject as "sister", a common term of familiarity amongst black women.

== Chart performance ==
"Sexy, Sexy, Sexy" peaked at No. 6 on Billboard's R&B chart for multiple weeks. The song also performed strongly on Billboard's Hot 100 chart, peaking at number 50 and staying on the chart for a total of 8 weeks. It also peaked at No. 6 on the Soul Singles Chart. The song also performed on the Cashbox chart. On this chart, "Sexy, Sexy, Sexy" peaked at number 46 and stayed on the chart for a total of 7 weeks. The only other song on the album soundtrack to perform well on the mainstream charts was Brown's previously released single "Brother Rapp", which reached number 2 on Billboard's R&B chart and number 32 on the same magazine's Pop chart.

== Releases ==
"Sexy, Sexy, Sexy" was released as both part of the soundtrack for Slaughter's Big Rip-Off and also as a single in 1973. Both forms were distributed under the German-British record label Polydor Records, who had signed James Brown during the early stages of his career. The soundtrack was released on a 12-inch vinyl manufactured for a full-length album. The original album cover followed a poster-like design. It depicted James Brown in gangster attire, wearing a trench coat, fedora hat and carrying a machine-gun. Furthermore, images from the film were included in the bottom right quarter of the cover. These included artwork of Brown, Marcia and other film related imagery. Finally, at the top of the vinyl sleeve appears red text labelling Brown the Godfather of Soul, a popular nickname he was well known by. The single was released as a 7-inch vinyl. The artwork for the single differed to that of the wider album cover. While Brown was again depicted wearing the gangster attire, the film imagery was omitted. Furthermore, here Brown's gun is firing and "Sexy, Sexy, Sexy" is described as Slaughter's theme. The single was also released under Polydor with two separate covers in Belgium and France. The France version included a close-up of Brown with green text. While the Belgium single was released in the Discotheque Special Series and depicted bright fluorescent pink text. Both were released on 7 inch 45 RPM vinyl. On July 24, 2020, the soundtrack was remastered and released under Republic Records, a label owned by Universal Music Group (UMG). The reissue is available at in the United Kingdom at a price of 10 pounds, or 13.50 US dollars.
