= Ain't It Funky Now =

"Ain't It Funky Now (Part 1)"

Single by James Brown

from the album Ain't It Funky
- B-side: "Ain't It Funky Now (Part 2)"
- Released: 1969
- Recorded: 1969
- Genre: Funk
- Length: 3:10 (Part 1); 3:15 (Part 2)
- Label: King; 6280
- Songwriter: James Brown
- Producer: James Brown

James Brown charting singles chronology
"Part Two (Let a Man Come In and Do the Popcorn)" (1969)	"Ain't It Funky Now (Part 1)" (1969)	"It's a New Day (Part 1) & (Part 2)" (1970)

Audio video
- "Ain't It Funky Now (Parts 1 and 2)" on YouTube

"Ain't it Funky Now" is a funk instrumental by James Brown. Released as a two-part single in 1969, the song charted #3 R&B and #24 Pop. The recording also appeared on the 1970 album Ain't It Funky.

A live performance of "Ain't It Funky Now" is included on Love Power Peace (1992; recorded 1971).

== Chart performance ==
Chart (1969–1970)	Peak position
US Billboard Hot 100	24
US Best Selling Soul Singles (Billboard)	3
