= Down and Out in New York City =

Single by James Brown

from the album Black Caesar
- B-side: "Mama's Dead"
- Released: 1973
- Genre: Soul, funk
- Length: 3:15
- Label: King; 14162
- Songwriter(s): Bodie Chandler; Barry De Vorzon
- Producer(s): James Brown

James Brown charting singles chronology
"I Got Ants in My Pants - Part 1" (1973)	"Down and Out in New York City" (1973)	"'Make It Good To Yourself'" (1973)

Audio video
- "Down And Out In New York City" on YouTube

"Down and Out in New York City" is a song written by Bodie Chandler and Barry De Vorzon and recorded by James Brown. It appears in the film Black Caesar and is included on the film's soundtrack album. The song was co-arranged by Fred Wesley. It was released as a single in 1973 and charted #13 R&B and #50 Pop.

== Chart performance ==
Chart (1973)	Peak position
US Billboard Hot 100	50
US Billboard Best Selling Soul Singles	13
