= Soul on Top =

Studio album by James Brown
- Released: April 1970
- Recorded: November 10–11, 1969
- Studios: United Studios (Los Angeles, California)
- Genres: Soul; Jazz
- Length: 51:57 (2004 reissue)
- Labels: King; 0032-1100
- Producer: James Brown

James Brown chronology
Ain't It Funky (1970)	Soul on Top (1970)	It's a New Day – Let a Man Come In (1970)

Soul on Top is the 28th studio album by American musician James Brown. The album was released in April 1970, by King. Brown and saxophonist Maceo Parker worked with arranger/conductor Oliver Nelson to record a big band, funk and jazz vocal album. It was recorded with Louie Bellson and his 18-piece jazz orchestra at United Western Recorders in Hollywood, California in November 1969, and features jazz standards, show tunes, and middle of the road hits, as well as a new arrangement of Brown's funk hit "Papa's Got a Brand New Bag".

The album was reissued in 2004 with five unedited tracks, one previously unreleased bonus track (a big band version of Brown's 1967 hit "There Was a Time"), and new liner notes by jazz critic Francis Davis alongside the original notes from Leonard Feather

== Chart performance ==
The album debuted on Billboard magazine's Top LP's chart in the issue dated May 16, 1970, peaking at No. 125 during a ten-week run on the chart.

== Critical reception ==
Professional ratings
Review scores
Source	Rating
AllMusic	4/5 stars
The Rolling Stone Album Guide	2.5/5 stars
The Village Voice	A

Reviewing the Verve reissue for The Village Voice in September 2004, Tom Hull said, "This extends Ray Charles's omnivorous big-band soul, with Brown reinventing standards—'That's My Desire,' 'September Song,' 'Every Day I Have the Blues,' 'Papa's Got a Brand New Bag'—in front of Louie Bellson's orchestra, which arranger-conductor Oliver Nelson barely manages to discipline, so caught up is the band in the singer's excitement. In Brown's discography, just a curio. But in the whole history of big band jazz, there's never been a singer like him."

== Track listing ==
=== Original release ===
Side A
No.	Title	Writer(s)	Length
1.	"That's My Desire"	Helmy Kressa, Carroll Loveday	4:08
2.	"Your Cheatin' Heart"	Hank Williams	2:59
3.	"What Kind of Fool Am I?"	Leslie Bricusse, Anthony Newley	3:02
4.	"It's a Man's, Man's, Man's World"	James Brown, Betty Jean Newsome	6:22
5.	"The Man in the Glass"	Bud Hobgood	5:56

Side B
No.	Title	Writer(s)	Length
6.	"It's Magic"	Sammy Cahn, Jule Styne	3:09
7.	"September Song"	Maxwell Anderson, Kurt Weill	4:29
8.	"For Once in My Life"	Ron Miller, Orlando Murden	4:33
9.	"Every Day I Have the Blues"	Memphis Slim	3:30
10.	"I Need Your Key (To Turn Me On)"	Louie Bellson	3:44
11.	"Papa's Got a Brand New Bag"	Brown	2:57

=== CD reissue ===
No.	Title	Writer(s)	Length
1.	"That's My Desire"	Helmy Kressa, Carroll Loveday	4:10
2.	"Your Cheatin' Heart"	Hank Williams	2:59
3.	"What Kind of Fool Am I?"	Leslie Bricusse, Anthony Newley	3:06
4.	"It's a Man's, Man's, Man's World" (Unedited Version)	James Brown, Betty Jean Newsome	6:40
5.	"The Man in the Glass"	Bud Hobgood	5:56
6.	"It's Magic"	Sammy Cahn, Jule Styne	3:14
7.	"September Song" (Unedited Version)	Maxwell Anderson, Kurt Weill	5:02
8.	"For Once in My Life" (Unedited Version)	Ron Miller, Orlando Murden	4:43
9.	"Every Day I Have the Blues" (Unedited Version)	Memphis Slim	4:28
10.	"I Need Your Key (To Turn Me On)"	Louie Bellson	3:46
11.	"Papa's Got a Brand New Bag" (Unedited Version)	Brown	4:41
12.	"There Was a Time" (previously unissued)	Brown, Bud Hobgood	3:04

== Personnel ==
- James Brown – vocals
- Ernie Watts, Joe Romano – alto saxophone
- Maceo Parker, Buddy Collette, Pete Christlieb – tenor saxophone
- James Mulidore – baritone saxophone
- Al Aarons, Chuck Findley, John Audino, Tom Porello – trumpet
- Jimmy Cleveland, Nick DiMaio, Kenny Shroyer, Bill Tole – trombone
- Frank Vincent – piano
- Bill Pitman, Louis Shelton – guitar
- Ray Brown – double bass
- Jack Arnold – percussion
- Louie Bellson – drums, bandleader
- Oliver Nelson – arranger and conductor

== Notes ==
- Terrel, Tom (October 5, 2004). "James Brown's 'Soul on Top' Reissued". National Public Radio. Retrieved on April 27, 2007.

== Charts ==
Chart (1970)	Peak position
US Billboard Top LPs	125
