= Russ Marin =

American actor

- Born: May 1, 1934; Massachusetts, U.S.
- Died: March 6, 2005 (aged 70); Los Angeles, California, U.S.
- Occupation: Actor
- Years active: 1972–1991

Russ Marin (May 1, 1934 – March 6, 2005) was an American film and television actor active from the early 1970s to the early 1990s.

== Career ==
Among the many shows he guest starred include Mannix, Bonanza, The Secrets of Isis, Wonder Woman, The Waltons, Night Court, Falcon Crest, and Murder She Wrote. His many film appearances included Kansas City Bomber, the blaxploitation flick Slaughter's Big Rip-Off starring Jim Brown, Capone, The Feather and Father Gang, Body Double and Mommie Dearest. Cheers... 2nd-season episode" no help wanted". He also appeared in the Battlestar Galactica episode 22, "Experiment in Terra" (1979).

== Selected filmography ==
Year	Title	Role	Notes
1972	Kansas City Bomber	Dick Wicks	
1973	Slaughter's Big Rip-Off	Crowder	
1974	Inside Amy	Sgt. Harry Morris	
1975	If You Don't Stop It... You'll Go Blind		
1975	Capone	Joseph Stenson	
1976	Lifeguard	Voyeur	
1976	Lollipop Palace	Percy	Uncredited
1978	An Enemy of the People		
1979	The Dark	Dr. Baranowski	
1980	Seed of Innocence	Marv	
1981	Mommie Dearest	Funeral Director	
1982	The Sword and the Sorcerer	Mogullen	
1984	Cheers	(Episode "No Help Wanted")	
1984	Body Double	Frank	
1985	Stitches	Doctor Sidney Berman	
1986	Deadly Friend	Dr. Henry Johanson	
1990	Running Against Time	Chris's Doctor	
