= I Got Ants in My Pants =

"I Got Ants in My Pants - Part 1"

Single by James Brown
- B-side: "I Got Ants in My Pants - Part 15 & 16"
- Released: November 1972 or January 1973
- Recorded: October 10, 1971, Capricorn or Bobby Smith Studios, Macon, GA
- Genre: Funk
- Length: 3:02 (Part 1); 3:58 (Part 15 & 16)
- Label: Polydor; 14162
- Songwriter(s): James Brown
- Producer(s): James Brown

James Brown charting singles chronology
"What My Baby Needs Now Is a Little More Lovin'" (1972)	"I Got Ants in My Pants - Part 1" (1972)	"Down and Out in New York City" (1973)

Audio video
- "I Got Ants In My Pants (And I Want To Dance)" on YouTube

"I Got Ants in My Pants (and I Want to Dance)" is a funk song by James Brown. Recorded in 1971 and released as a two-part single in November 1972 or January 1973, it charted #4 R&B and #27 Pop. It did not receive an album release. A remixed version was included on the 1988 compilation album Motherlode, Part 1 to Star Time and the whole cut again in Make It Funky: The Big Payback.

== Later uses ==
The song was sampled in the 1973 break-in record, "Super Fly Meets Shaft" (US #31).

A guitar riff from this song was sampled by Public Enemy on their track "Don't Believe the Hype" from the album It Takes a Nation of Millions to Hold Us Back.
