= Get Up (I Feel Like Being a) Sex Machine =

1970 single by James Brown

"Get Up (I Feel Like Being a) Sex Machine (Part 1)"
- King label with variant title wording

Single by James Brown
- B-side: "Get Up I Feel Like Being Like a Sex Machine (Part 2)"
- Released: July 1970
- Recorded: April 25, 1970
- Studio: Starday-King Sound (Nashville)
- Genre: Funk
- Length: 2:49 (single part 1); 2:33 (single part 2); 5:15 (complete original version); 10:48 (album version)
- Label: King
- Songwriters: James Brown; Bobby Byrd; Ron Lenhoff
- Producer: James Brown

James Brown charting singles chronology
"Brother Rapp (Part 1) & (Part 2)" (1970)	"Get Up (I Feel Like Being a) Sex Machine (Part 1)" (1970)	"Super Bad (Part 1 & Part 2)" (1970)

Audio sample
- file; help

Audio video
- "Get Up (I Feel Like Being a) Sex Machine" on YouTube

"Get Up (I Feel Like Being a) Sex Machine" is a funk song recorded by James Brown with Bobby Byrd on backing vocals. Released as a two-part single in 1970, it was a no. 2 R&B hit and reached no. 15 on the Billboard Hot 100.

In 2004, "Sex Machine" was ranked number 326 on Rolling Stone magazine's list of the 500 greatest songs of all time. In the 2021 update of the list it had risen to 196.

In 2014, the original 1970 recording of "Get Up (I Feel Like Being a) Sex Machine" on the King Records label was inducted into the Grammy Hall of Fame. In June 2026, CBS News included the song in its list of the 250 essential American songs of the past 250 years, one of two Brown songs to be included.

== Analysis ==
"Sex Machine" was one of the first songs Brown recorded with his new band, The J.B.'s. In comparison with Brown's 1960s solo funk hits such as "Papa's Got a Brand New Bag", the band's inexperienced horn section plays a relatively minor part. Instead, the song centers on the insistent riff played by brothers Bootsy and Catfish Collins on bass and guitar and Jabo Starks on drums, along with the call and response interplay between Brown and Byrd's vocals, which consist mostly of exhortations to "get up / stay on the scene / like a sex machine". During the song's final vocal passages Brown and Byrd started to sing the main hook of Elmore James' blues classic "Shake Your Moneymaker."

The original single version of "Sex Machine"—recorded, like many of Brown's hits, in just two takes—begins with a spoken dialogue between Brown and his band which was recreated with minor variations in live performances:

Fellas, I'm ready to get up and do my thing! (Yeah! That's right! Do it!) I want to get into it, man, you know? (Go ahead! Yeah!) Like a, like a sex machine, man, (Yeah!) movin', groovin', doin' it, y'know? (Yeah!) Can I count it off? (Okay! Alright!) One, two, three, four!

== Personnel ==
- James Brown – lead vocal, piano

with The J.B.'s:

- Clayton "Chicken" Gunnells – trumpet
- Darryl "Hassan" Jamison – trumpet
- Robert McCollough – tenor saxophone
- Bobby Byrd – Hammond organ, vocal
- Phelps "Catfish" Collins – guitar
- William "Bootsy" Collins – bass guitar
- John "Jabo" Starks – drums

== Chart positions ==
Chart (1970)	Peak position
Belgium (Ultratop 50 Flanders)	4
Netherlands (Dutch Top 40)	8
Netherlands (Single Top 100)	7
UK Singles (Official Charts)	32
US Billboard Best Selling Soul Singles	2
US Billboard Hot 100	15
US Cash Box	17
US Record World	17
West Germany (GfK)	29

== Other recordings ==
"Sex Machine Part I"

Single by James Brown

from the album Sex Machine Today
- B-side: "Sex Machine Part II"
- Released: 1975
- Length: 5:45 (Part I); 5:09 (Part II)
- Label: Polydor 14270
- Songwriters: James Brown; Bobby Byrd; Ron Lenhoff

James Brown charting singles chronology
"Reality" (1975)	"Sex Machine Part I" (1975)	"Hustle!!! (Dead on It)" (1975)

Brown would go on to re-record "Sex Machine" several times in addition to the original single version:

- A 1970 version for his ostensibly all-live Sex Machine album. It is over 10 minutes long and includes added reverb and overdubbed audience noise intended to conceal its studio origins. (A version of this recording without overdubs appears on the 1996 compilation Funk Power 1970: A Brand New Thang.)
- A 1975 version features a new instrumental arrangement and lyrics aimed at disco audiences. Nearly 12 minutes long, it was released as a two-part single and appeared on the album Sex Machine Today. Though it was poorly reviewed — Robert Christgau wrote that "if you own another version of 'Sex Machine' you own a better one" — it charted no. 16 on the R&B charts.
- In 1986, Japanese musician Haruomi Hosono's group Friends of Earth (F.O.E.) remake the album "SEX, ENERGY & STAR" in a digital funk style, with guest vocals from James Brown himself and Maceo Parker on saxophone. Due to this relationship, F.O.E. joined the band as a frontliner during James Brown's tour in Japan in February 1986, and received angry shouts, abuse, and loud booing from conservative JB's fans.
- In 1993, Brown sang another version that was released in collaboration with his sponsorship of Nissin's Cup Noodles Miso Flavor.

"Sex Machine" remained a staple of Brown's concert repertoire until the end of his career. Live performances of the song appear on the albums Revolution of the Mind: Live at the Apollo, Volume III (1971), Hot on the One (1980), Live in New York (1981), Love, Power, Peace: Live at the Olympia, Paris, 1971 (1992), and Live at the Apollo 1995.

Chart (1975)	Peak position
US Billboard Hot 100	61
US Billboard Hot Soul Singles	16

Chart (1985)	Peak position
UK Singles (Official Charts)	47

Chart (1986)	Peak position
Belgium (Ultratop 50 Flanders)	34
UK Singles (Official Charts)	46

Chart (1991)	Peak position
UK Singles (Official Charts)	69

Chart (2007)	Peak position
Germany (GfK); 2007 remix	83
