= Coldblooded (James Brown song) =

Single by James Brown

from the album Hell
- A-side: "Funky President (People It's Bad)"
- Released: October 1974
- Recorded: March 24, 1974, International Studios, Augusta, GA; additional recording April 1974, Sound Ideas, New York, NY
- Genre: Funk
- Length: 4:45
- Label: Polydor; 14258
- Songwriter(s): James Brown
- Producer(s): James Brown

James Brown charting singles chronology
"Funky President (People It's Bad)" (1974)	"Coldblooded" (1974)	"Reality" (1975)

Audio video
- "Coldblooded" on YouTube

"Coldblooded" is a song written and recorded by James Brown. It was released in 1974 as the B-side of "Funky President (People It's Bad)" and charted #99 Pop. It also appeared on the album Hell. Writing in Rolling Stone, Robert Palmer praised the song as a "sure-fire disco [smash], the kind of no-nonsense party music one expects from Soul Brother Number One."

== Personnel ==
- James Brown - vocals
- Isaiah "Ike" Oakley - trumpet
- Fred Wesley - trombone
- Maceo Parker - alto sax
- Jimmy Parker - alto sax
- St. Clair Pinckney - tenor sax
- Jimmy Nolen - guitar
- Hearlon "Cheese" Martin - guitar
- Fred Thomas - bass
- John "Jabo" Starks - drums
- Johnny Griggs - congas
- Fred Wesley or Bob Both - percussion
