= Reality (James Brown song) =

Single by James Brown

from the album Reality
- B-side: "I Need Your Love So Bad"
- Released: 1974
- Genre: Funk
- Length: 4:14
- Label: Polydor; 14268
- Songwriter(s): James Brown; Fred Wesley; Gertrude Wesley
- Producer(s): James Brown

James Brown charting singles chronology
""Coldblooded" (B-side of "Funky President (People It's Bad)")" (1974)	"Reality" (1974)	"Sex Machine Part I" (1975)

Audio video
- "Reality" on YouTube

"Reality" is a song recorded by James Brown. Released as a single in 1975, it charted #19 R&B and #80 Pop. It also appeared on an album of the same name.
