= World (James Brown song) =

"World (Part 1)"

Single by James Brown

from the album It's a New Day - Let a Man Come In
- B-side: "World (Part 2)"
- Released: 1969
- Recorded: 1969
- Genre: Soul
- Length: 3:10 (Part 1); 2:58 (Part 2)
- Label: King; 6258
- Songwriter: James Brown
- Producer: James Brown

James Brown singles chronology
"Lowdown Popcorn" (1969)	"World (Part 1)" (1969)	"Let a Man Come In and Do the Popcorn Part One" (1969)

Audio video
- "World (Pt. 1 & 2)" on YouTube

"World" is a song written and performed by James Brown. It was released as a two-part single

== Background ==
Critic Douglas Wolk described the song as "overwrought".

== Chart performance ==
"World" charted at No. 8 R&B and No. 37 Pop.
