= Superbad, Superslick =

"Superbad, Superslick Part I"

Single by James Brown

from the album Everybody's Doin' the Hustle & Dead on the Double Bump
- B-side: "Superbad, Superslick Part II"
- Released: October 1975
- Genre: Funk
- Length: 4:04 (Part I); 3:27 (Part II)
- Label: Polydor; 14295
- Songwriter: James Brown
- Producer: James Brown

James Brown charting singles chronology
"Hustle!!! (Dead on It)" (1975)	"Superbad, Superslick Part I" (1975)	"Hot (I Need to Be Loved, Loved, Loved, Loved)" (1975)

Audio video
- "Superbad, Superslick" on YouTube

"Superbad, Superslick" is a song written and recorded by James Brown. Released as a two-part single in 1975, it charted #28 R&B. Part I of the song was subsequently issued as the B-side of Brown's next single, "Hot (I Need to Be Loved, Loved, Loved, Loved)". The song also appeared on the album Everybody's Doin' the Hustle & Dead on the Double Bump.
