= Hot (I Need to Be Loved, Loved, Loved) =

"Hot (I Need to Be Loved, Loved, Loved, Loved)"

Single by James Brown

from the album Hot
- B-side: "Superbad, Superslick Part I"
- Released: December 1975
- Recorded: September–October 1975, Sound Ideas, New York, NY
- Genre: Funk, disco
- Length: 6:03
- Label: Polydor; 14301
- Songwriter(s): James Brown
- Producer(s): James Brown

James Brown charting singles chronology
"Superbad, Superslick Part I" (1975)	"Hot (I Need to Be Loved, Loved, Loved, Loved)" (1975)	"(I Love You) For Sentimental Reasons" (1976)

Audio video
- "Hot (I Need To Be Loved, Loved, Loved, Loved)" on YouTube

"Hot (I Need to Be Loved, Loved, Loved, Loved)" is a funk song by James Brown. Released as a single in December 1975, it reached #31 on the R&B chart. It uses the main riff from the David Bowie song "Fame", released earlier the same year. Guitarist Carlos Alomar, who created the borrowed riff and was a co-writer on "Fame", was briefly in Brown's band in the late 1960s. Alomar said, "[Bowie] was extremely flattered that James Brown would take one of his songs." The song also appeared as the lead track on Brown's 1976 album Hot.
