= Hustle!!! (Dead on It) =

Single by James Brown

from the album Everybody's Doin' the Hustle & Dead on the Double Bump
- B-side: "Dead on It Part II"
- Released: July 1975
- Genre: Funk
- Length: 4:58 (Part 1); 5:48 (Part 2)
- Label: Polydor; 14281
- Songwriter: James Brown
- Producer: James Brown

James Brown charting singles chronology
"Sex Machine Part I" (1975)	"Hustle!!! (Dead on It)" (1975)	"Superbad, Superslick Part I" (1975)

Audio video
- "Hustle!!! (Dead On It)" on YouTube

"Hustle!!! (Dead on It)" is a song written and recorded by James Brown. Released as a single in 1975, the song charted #11 R&B. "Hustle" was the lead track on his album Everybody's Doin' the Hustle & Dead on the Double Bump. The song's title refers to the popular dance the Hustle.

The track is a jam session and features a spoken interlude from Brown in which he discusses his lack of commercial success in the singles chart: "Now when we finish this session, they'll know where the funk come from."
