= It's a New Day (James Brown song) =

"It's a New Day (Part 1) & (Part 2)"

Single by James Brown

from the album It's a New Day – Let a Man Come In
- B-side: "Georgia on My Mind"
- Released: February 1970
- Recorded: September 3, 1969, King Studios, Cincinnati, OH
- Genre: Funk
- Length: 5:45
- Label: King; 6292
- Songwriter(s): James Brown
- Producer(s): James Brown

James Brown charting singles chronology
"Ain't It Funky Now (Part 1)" (1969)	"It's a New Day (Part 1) & (Part 2)" (1970)	"Funky Drummer (Part 1)" (1970)

Audio video
- "It's A New Day (Pt. 1 & 2)" on YouTube

"It's a New Day" is a funk song written and performed by James Brown. Released as a single in 1970, it charted #3 R&B and #32 Pop.

Live performances of the song appear on the albums Revolution of the Mind (1971) and Love Power Peace (1992; recorded 1971).
