= Stoned to the Bone =

"Stoned to the Bone - Part 1"

Single by James Brown

from the album The Payback
- B-side: "Stoned to the Bone (Some More)"
- Released: November 1973
- Recorded: October 2, 1973, International Studios, Augusta, GA
- Genre: Funk
- Length: 4:00 (Part 1); 5:27 (Some More)
- Label: Polydor; 14210
- Songwriter(s): James Brown
- Producer(s): James Brown

James Brown charting singles chronology
"Sexy, Sexy, Sexy" (1973)	"Stoned to the Bone - Part 1" (1973)	"The Payback - Part I" (1974)

Audio video
- "Stone To The Bone" on YouTube

"Stoned to the Bone", titled "Stone to the Bone" in some releases, is a song written and recorded by James Brown. Released as a two-part single in 1973, it charted #4 R&B and #58 Pop. It also appeared on the album The Payback.
