= Papa Don't Take No Mess =

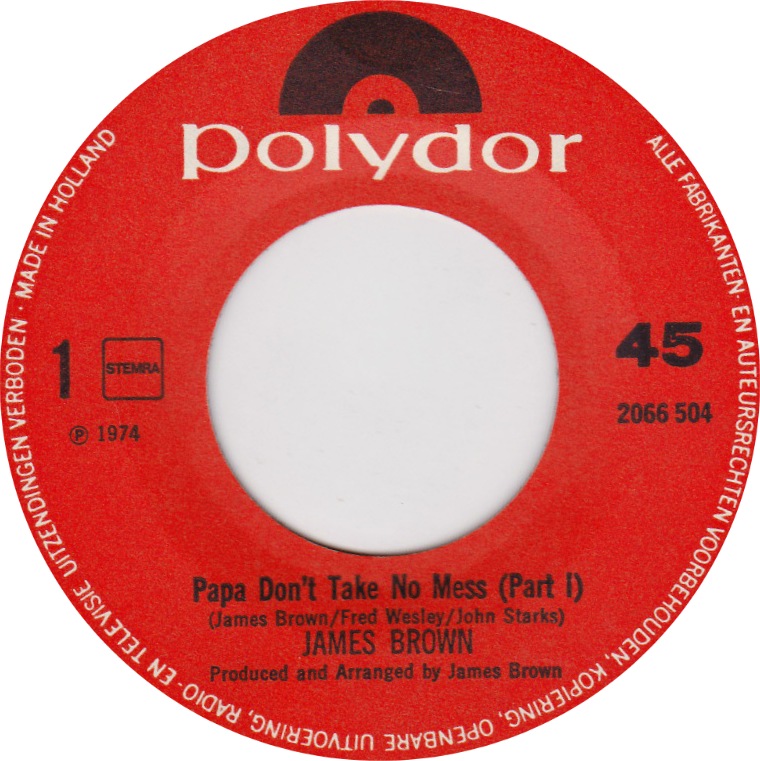

Single by James Brown

from the album Hell
- A-side: "Papa Don't Take No Mess Part I"
- B-side: "Papa Don't Take No Mess Part II"
- Released: August 1974
- Recorded: August 23, 1973, International Studios, Augusta, GA
- Genre: Funk
- Length: 4:30 (Part I); 5:00 (Part II)
- Label: Polydor; 14255
- Songwriters: James Brown; Fred Wesley; John Starks; Charles Bobbit
- Producer: James Brown

James Brown charting singles chronology
"My Thang" (1974)	"Papa Don't Take No Mess" (1974)	"Funky President (People It's Bad)" (1974)

Audio video
- "Papa Don't Take No Mess" on YouTube

"Papa Don't Take No Mess" is a funk song performed by American musician James Brown. An edited version of the song released as a two-part single in 1974 was Brown's 17th and final number one R&B hit and peaked at number thirty-one on the Hot 100. The full-length version, nearly 14 minutes long, appeared on the double album Hell.

Like "The Payback," "Papa Don't Take No Mess" was originally recorded for a rejected soundtrack to the blaxploitation film Hell Up in Harlem.

Record World said that the song is "carefully fashioned from disco and pure black leather funk."

== Personnel ==
- James Brown - lead vocal

with Fred Wesley and The J.B.'s:

- Fred Wesley - trombone
- Ike Oakley - trumpet
- Maceo Parker - alto saxophone
- St. Clair Pinckney - tenor saxophone
- Jimmy Nolen - guitar
- Hearlon "Cheese" Martin - guitar
- Fred Thomas - bass
- John "Jabo" Starks - drums
- John Morgan or Johnny Griggs - percussion

A piano solo, performed by Brown, is included in the longer edit that appears on the Hell album.

== Covers and samples ==
Steely Dan covered this song in the band introduction segment of their "Rarities night" concerts in September 2011.

The song, like much of Brown's catalogue, was sampled into many other compositions, most notably in Janet Jackson's 1993 hit song "That's the Way Love Goes" from her album Janet. Biz Markie also used the song in his 1988 music "Vapors" from his debut album Goin' Off.
