= Get Up, Get into It, Get Involved =

1970 song by James Brown

"Get Up, Get into It, Get Involved Pt. 1"

Single by James Brown
- B-side: "Get Up, Get into It, Get Involved Pt. 2"
- Released: December 1970
- Recorded: November 3, 1970, King Studios, Cincinnati, OH
- Genre: Funk
- Length: 3:32 (Pt. 1); 3:34 (Pt. 2); 7:09 (full-length)
- Label: King; 6347
- Songwriters: James Brown; Bobby Byrd; Ron Lenhoff
- Producer: James Brown

James Brown charting singles chronology
"Santa Claus Is Definitely Here to Stay Vocal" (1970)	"Get Up, Get into It, Get Involved Pt. 1" (1970)	"Spinning Wheel Pt. 1" (1971)

Audio video
- "Get Up, Get Into It, Get Involved (Stereo Mix)" on YouTube

"Get Up, Get into It, Get Involved" is a funk song recorded by James Brown. It was released as a two-part single in 1970 and charted #4 R&B and #34 Pop. It features backing vocals by Bobby Byrd, who shared writing credit for the song with Brown and Ron Lenhoff. This was one of several songs by Brown with an upfront social message.

The unedited version appears on the 1996 compilation Funk Power 1970: A Brand New Thang. Live performances of the song appear on the albums Revolution of the Mind (1971) and Love Power Peace (1992; recorded 1971).

Performers included drummer Clyde Stubblefield, Bootsy Collins, and his brother, guitarist Catfish Collins.

== Sample used ==
- Big Daddy Kane – Set It Off (1988)
- BDP – "South Bronx" (1987)
- Full Force – "Ain't My Type of Hype" (1990)
- MC Shan – "Juice Crew Law"
- Public Enemy – "Brothers Gonna Work It Out" and "Can't Truss It"
- Technotronic – "Get Up! (Before the Night Is Over)" (1990)
- Pras Michel – "Ghetto Supastar (That Is What You Are)" (1998)
