= Let a Man Come In and Do the Popcorn =

1969 single by James Brown

"Let a Man Come In and Do the Popcorn Part One"

Single by James Brown

from the album It's a New Day - Let a Man Come In
- B-side: "Sometime"
- Released: 1969
- Recorded: 1969
- Genre: Soul, funk
- Length: 2:58
- Label: King; 6255
- Songwriter(s): James Brown
- Producer(s): James Brown

James Brown charting singles chronology
"World (Part 1)" (1969)	"Let a Man Come In and Do the Popcorn Part One" (1969)	"Part Two (Let a Man Come In and Do the Popcorn)" (1969)

Audio video
- "Let A Man Come In And Do The Popcorn (Pt. 1 & 2)" on YouTube

"Part Two (Let a Man Come In and Do the Popcorn)"

Single by James Brown

from the album It's a New Day - Let a Man Come In
- B-side: "Gittin' a Little Hipper"
- Released: 1969
- Recorded: 1969
- Genre: Soul, funk
- Length: 2:58
- Label: King; 6275
- Songwriter(s): James Brown
- Producer(s): James Brown

James Brown charting singles chronology
"Let a Man Come In and Do the Popcorn Part One" (1969)	"Part Two (Let a Man Come In and Do the Popcorn)" (1969)	"Ain't It Funky Now (Part 1)" (1969)

"Let a Man Come In and Do the Popcorn" is a song by James Brown. Brown's 1969 recording of the song was split into two parts which were released consecutively as singles. Both of the singles charted, with Part One rising to #2 R&B and #21 Pop and Part Two reaching #6 R&B and #40 Pop. The full recording of the song was included on the 1970 album It's a New Day - Let a Man Come In.
