= Brother Rapp =

"Brother Rapp (Part 1) & (Part 2)"

Single by James Brown

from the album Sex Machine
- B-side: "Bewildered"
- Released: April 1970
- Genre: Funk
- Length: 3:00 (Part 1); 2:20 (Part 2)
- Label: King; 6310
- Songwriter(s): James Brown
- Producer(s): James Brown

James Brown charting singles chronology
"Funky Drummer (Part 1)" (1970)	"Brother Rapp (Part 1) & (Part 2)" (1970)	"Get Up I Feel Like Being Like a Sex Machine (Part 1)" (1970)

Audio video
- "Brother Rapp (Pts.1 & 2)" on YouTube

"Brother Rapp" is a 1970 funk song written and performed by James Brown. It was first released as a two-part single on King Records (K6285) in early 1970 (under the title "The Brother Got to Rap"), but was quickly withdrawn from sale. It was released again later that year in a mechanically sped-up version that charted #2 R&B and #32 Pop. It also appeared on the album Sex Machine with overdubbed crowd noise, and Brown later issued it in a faded version with different guitar work, in 1973 for the Slaughter's Big Rip-Off soundtrack album. A live version of "Brother Rapp" is included on the album Love Power Peace.

In his 1986 autobiography, Brown related the lyrical message of "Brother Rapp" to his support of hip hop music:

I admire the rap and the break dancing and all the stuff coming out of hip hop. A lot of the records are messages that express community problems. Used right, those records could help prevent the riots of the sixties from happening again. If you know how a community feels about things, then you can do something about it... That's what my song "Brother Rapp" is all about. A fella is calling on his lady and protesting at the same time: "Don't put me in jail before I get a chance to rap. Here what I'm saying. When you see me on a soapbox out there complaining, don't lock me up. Sit down and join me." And that's what I'm saying about these records. Let 'em testify. Let the brothers rap.
