= Black Caesar (album) =

Soundtrack album by James Brown
- Released: February 1973
- Recorded: April 18 – December 6, 1972
- Studio: Cavern Studios (Independence, Missouri); A&R Studios (New York City, New York); International Studios (Augusta, Georgia)
- Genre: Funk
- Length: 36:17
- Label: Polydor; PD 6014
- Producer: James Brown

James Brown chronology
Get on the Good Foot (1972)	Black Caesar (1973)	Slaughter's Big Rip-Off (1973)

Singles from Black Caesar
- 1. "Mama Feelgood" Released: March 1973; 2. "Down and Out in New York City / Mama's Dead" Released: February 1973

Black Caesar is a soundtrack album recorded by James Brown for the film of the same name and released in February 1973. The album also features The J.B.'s and Lyn Collins.

While critical reception was mixed due to being seen as disconnected to the film's plot, it has since been recognized as one of James Brown's better late works.

== Critical reception ==
Professional ratings
Review scores
Source	Rating
AllMusic	3.5/5 stars
Robert Christgau	D+
The Rolling Stone Album Guide	2/5 stars

In a 1980 consumer guide to James Brown's albums following the dissolution of King Records, Robert Christgau of The Village Voice gave Black Caesar a "D+" and stated, "You listen to Brown for music, not songs, but that's no reason to expect good soundtrack albums from him. He should never be allowed near a vibraphone again."

However, other critics wrote more positively about the album. In a later retrospective review, Mark Deming of AllMusic gives the album three-and-a-half out of five stars and feels that, "like most soundtrack albums of the period, Black Caesar sounds rather scattershot, especially when the music is divorced from the film's narrative," but observed "several top-notch tracks", including "The Boss", "Make It Good to Yourself", and "Mama's Dead". Deming adds that "Fred Wesley's superb horn charts, Jimmy Nolen's percussive guitar, and Jabo Starks' dead-on-the-one drumming make even the weaker instrumental cuts worth a quick listen". Dave Thompson calls it a "kick-ass soundtrack" and "nothing short of a full frontal funk assault."

== Track listing ==
No.	Title	Writer(s)	Length
1.	"Down and Out in New York City"	Bodie Chandler, Barry De Vorzon	4:43
2.	"Blind Man Can See It"	James Brown, Charles Bobbit, Fred Wesley	2:18
3.	"Sportin' Life"	Brown, Bobbit, Wesley	3:50
4.	"Dirty Harri"	Brown	1:29
5.	"The Boss"	Brown, Bobbit, Wesley	3:14
6.	"Make It Good to Yourself"	Brown, Bobbit, Wesley	3:18
7.	"Mama Feelgood" (Performed by Lyn Collins)	Brown, Lyn Collins	3:29
8.	"Mama's Dead"	Brown, Wesley	4:47
9.	"White Lightning (I Mean Moonshine)"	Brown, Bobbit, Wesley	2:40
10.	"Chase"	Brown, Bobbit, Wesley, Jan Hammer	2:38
11.	"Like It Is, Like It Was"	Brown	3:51

== Personnel ==
- James Brown – vocals, organ, piano

The J.B.'s arranged by James Brown (Tracks 2, 4, 5, 6, 7 & 11)

- Lyn Collins – co-vocals ("Mama Feelgood")
- Russell Crimes, Isiah "Ike" Oakley, Darryl “Hasaan” Jamison, Jerone “Jasaan” Sanford – trumpet
- Fred Wesley – trombone
- Jimmy Parker – alto saxophone
- St. Clair Pinckney, Eldee Williams – tenor saxophone
- probably David Matthews – electric piano
- Jimmy Nolen, Hearlon "Cheese" Martin, Bobby Roach – electric guitar
- Fred Thomas – bass guitar
- Johnny Griggs, John Morgan – percussion
- John "Jabo" Starks, John Morgan – drums

Studio band arranged by Fred Wesley (Tracks 1, 3 & 8)

- Marvin Stamm, Randy Brecker – trumpet
- Fred Wesley – trombone
- Joe Farrell – tenor saxophone
- Pat Rebillot – electric piano
- Hugh McCracken, Charlie Brown, David Spinozza – electric guitar
- Sam Brown – acoustic guitar
- Buster Williams – bass guitar
- Steve Gadd – drums

== Charts ==
Chart (1973)	Peak position
U.S. Billboard Top LPs & Tape	31
U.S. Best Selling Soul LPs	2
