= Slaughter's Big Rip-Off =

1973 film by Gordon Douglas

- Theatrical release poster
- Directed by: Gordon Douglas
- Written by: Charles Eric Johnson
- Produced by: Monroe Sachson
- Starring: Jim Brown; Ed McMahon; Don Stroud; Gloria Hendry; Dick Anthony Williams; Brock Peters
- Cinematography: Charles F. Wheeler
- Edited by: Kenneth G. Crane; Christopher Holmes
- Music by: James Brown; Fred Wesley
- Production company: American International Pictures
- Distributed by: American International Pictures
- Release date: August 31, 1973
- Running time: 94 minutes
- Country: United States
- Language: English
- Box office: $1 million (US/ Canada rentals)

Slaughter's Big Rip-Off is a 1973 blaxploitation film directed by Gordon Douglas and written by Charles Eric Johnson. The film stars Jim Brown, Ed McMahon, Don Stroud, Brock Peters, Gloria Hendry and Dick Anthony Williams. The film was released on August 31, 1973, by American International Pictures. It is the sequel to the 1972 film Slaughter.

== Plot ==
Slaughter (Jim Brown), a fierce Vietnam veteran and ex-Green Beret, had avenged the death of his parents by killing in Mexico the gangster responsible. He is now relocated in Los Angeles, California, where Slaughter sought to escape the past and try to have a tranquil life.

Slaughter goes to a friend's house for a lavish outdoor picnic and celebration. Meanwhile, a new crime boss, Duncan (Ed McMahon), is now after Slaughter, for having killed ex-Mafia boss Dominic Hoffo earlier. An old World War I biplane is seen flying by the outdoor celebration and then opening fire on the guests at the picnic. It results in the graphic death by headshot of Slaughter's friend, which reignites the old spark of fury and rage that Slaughter had when told of the death of his parents.

Duncan's first assassination attempt in essence is a failure and only succeeds in waking a sleeping beast. Duncan hires a new hit-man named Kirk (Don Stroud) to bring Slaughter to his demise. Rather than being in protective custody under the supervision of Duncan's crooked cops, Slaughter remains on the streets.

Slaughter's new friend is a police official, Det. Reynolds, who warns that his life is in peril. Slaughter also has a girlfriend, Marcia (Gloria Hendry), who is also being targeted by the mob, under Duncan's orders, to further provoke Slaughter.

Slaughter makes an agreement with Reynolds to obtain confidential documents of the Mafia's operations. He coaxes a drug-addicted pimp to assist him in breaking into Duncan's safe house and successfully escape with the documents. After gun fights, Slaughter and his pimp sidekick kill several of Duncan's guards and associates. In response, Duncan sends Kirk to kidnap Slaughter's girlfriend, a fatal mistake on Duncan's part.

== Cast ==
- Jim Brown as Slaughter
- Ed McMahon as Duncan
- Don Stroud as Kirk
- Brock Peters as Reynolds
- Gloria Hendry as Marcia
- Dick Anthony Williams as Joe Creole
- Art Metrano as Mario Burtoli
- Judith Brown as Norja
- Jacquliene Giroux as Mrs. Duncan
- Eddie Lo Russo as Arnie
- Russ McGinn as Harvey Parker
- Hoke Howell as Jimmy Parker
- Chuck Hicks as Lyle Parker
- Russ Marin as Crowder
- Nick Benedict as Gains

== Soundtrack ==
Professional ratings
Review scores
| Source | Rating |
|---|---|
| AllMusic | 2.5/5 stars |
| The Rolling Stone Album Guide | 2/5 stars |

The album for Slaughter's Big Rip-Off and the songs associated with it were composed by James Brown. On all media versions of the film however, the James Brown score has been replaced by new, generic funk sounds and versions of songs from the Coffy soundtrack.

All tracks are written by James Brown, Charles Bobbit, Fred Wesley; except where indicated.

Side one
| No. | Title | Writer(s) | Length |
|---|---|---|---|
| 1. | "Slaughter Theme" | | 4:00 |
| 2. | "Tryin' To Get Over" | | 2:30 |
| 3. | "Transmograpfication" | James Brown, David Matthews | 2:00 |
| 4. | "Happy For The Poor" | | 2:43 |
| 5. | "Brother Rap" | James Brown | 3:04 |
| 6. | "Big Strong" | | 3:15 |
| 7. | "Really, Really, Really" | | 1:48 |

Side two
| No. | Title | Writer(s) | Length |
|---|---|---|---|
| 8. | "Sexy, Sexy, Sexy" | James Brown | 3:10 |
| 9. | "To My Brother" | Fred Wesley, James Brown | 2:10 |
| 10. | "How Long Can I Keep It Up" (featuring Lyn Collins) | | 5:30 |
| 11. | "People Get Up and Drive Your Funky Soul" | James Brown, Fred Wesley, St. Clair Pinckney | 3:40 |
| 12. | "King Slaughter" | | 2:45 |
| 13. | "Straight Ahead" | | 2:45 |

== See also ==
- List of American films of 1973
