= Give It Up or Turnit a Loose =

Single by James Brown

from the album Ain't It Funky
- B-side: "I'll Lose My Mind"
- Released: January 1969
- Recorded: October 29, 1968, Criteria Studios, Miami, FL
- Genre: Funk
- Length: 2:45
- Label: King; 6213
- Songwriter(s): Charles Bobbit
- Producer(s): James Brown

James Brown charting singles chronology
"Tit for Tat (Ain't No Taking Back)" (1968)	"Give It Up or Turnit a Loose" (1969)	"Soul Pride (Part 1)" (1969)

Audio video
- "Give It Up Or Turnit A Loose" on YouTube

"Give It Up or Turnit a Loose" is a funk song recorded by James Brown. Released as a single in 1969, the song was a #1 R&B hit and also made the top 20 pop singles chart. "Give It Up or Turnit a Loose" appeared as an instrumental on the Ain't It Funky (1970) album, removing Brown's vocals and adding guitar overdubs, while the vocal version was released on It's a New Day – Let a Man Come In (1970).

== Recorded history ==
The original "Give It Up or Turnit a Loose" appeared as a single in early '69, arranged by the '60's bandleader "Pee Wee" Ellis. A year later, reinvigorated by his new band, Mr. Brown would readdress "Give It Up". Where the original version percolated with jazzy overtones, this revisit was kinetic, raw, uncut. This monster funk bomb exploded in the underground in '73, when a young Bronx DJ named Kool DJ Herc would load on the turntables two copies of the Sex Machine album and between them he would run an extended cut 'n' mix of the percussion breakdown. Hip-hop was born. The shockwaves have been felt ever since

—Stephen Ivory

Brown recorded "Give It Up or Turnit a Loose" again with The J.B.'s for his 1970 live double album Sex Machine. Over five minutes long, this later recording used a substantially different instrumental arrangement, with an added organ riff and a florid bassline, as well as different lyrics. This version features Clyde Stubblefield on drum kit performing in tandem with congas. A remix of this recording by Tim Rogers appears on the 1986 compilation album In the Jungle Groove. The remixed version has been extensively sampled. A genuine live version of the song appears on the album Live at Chastain Park (rec. 1985, rel. 1988).

In 1974 Lyn Collins recorded the song, with Brown producing.

Dick Hyman recorded a synthesizer version of "Give It Up or Turnit a Loose" on his 1969 album The Age of Electronicus.

== Charts ==
Chart (1969)	Peak position
U.S. Billboard Hot 100	15
U.S. Billboard Hot Black Singles	1

== Personnel ==
=== 1969 version ===
- James Brown - lead vocals

with the James Brown Orchestra:

- Waymon Reed – trumpet
- Richard "Kush" Griffith – trumpet
- Fred Wesley – trombone
- Alfred "Pee Wee" Ellis – alto saxophone
- Maceo Parker – tenor saxophone
- St. Clair Pinckney – baritone saxophone
- Jimmy Nolen – guitar
- Alphonso "Country" Kellum – guitar
- Charles Sherrell – bass
- Nate Jones – drums
- Chuck Kirkpatrick – recording engineer
