= My Thang =

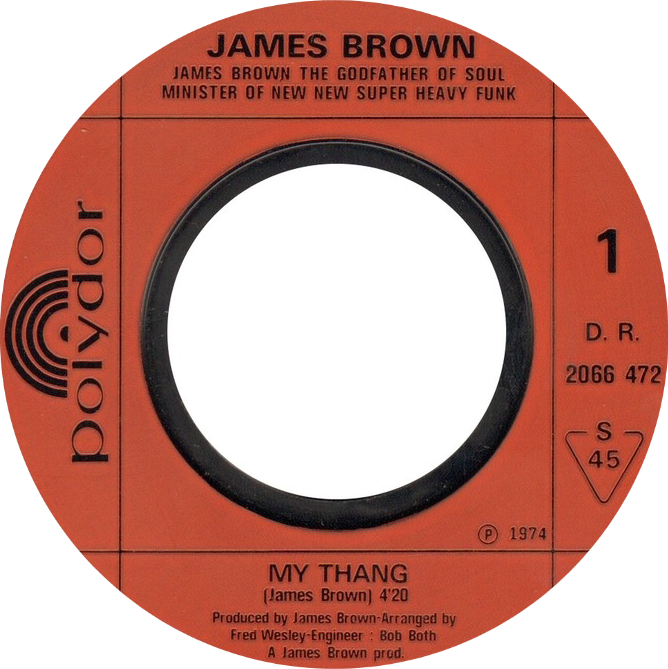

Single by James Brown

from the album Hell
- B-side: "People Get Up And Drive Your Funky Soul","I Know It's True","Public Enemy No. 1 - Part I"
- Released: April 1974
- Recorded: November 27, 1973, A&R Studios, New York, NY; additional recording March - April 1974, Sound Ideas, New York, NY
- Genre: Funk
- Length: 4:20
- Label: Polydor; 14244
- Songwriter: James Brown
- Producer: James Brown

James Brown charting singles chronology
"The Payback - Part I" (1974)	"My Thang" (1974)	"Papa Don't Take No Mess" (1974)

Audio video
- "My Thang" on YouTube

"My Thang" is a funk song written and recorded by James Brown. Unlike most of his songs, this song was released not as a two-part single, but instead issued with three different B-sides. It spent two weeks at number one on the R&B singles chart - Brown's second #1 in a row, following "The Payback" - and reached No. 29 on the Billboard Hot 100 in July 1974. The song also appeared on Brown's 1974 double album Hell.

== Personnel ==
- James Brown - lead vocals
- probably Lew Soloff - trumpet
- John Faddis - trumpet
- Michael Gipson - trombone
- David Sanborn - alto sax
- Frank Vicari - tenor sax
- Joe Farrell - tenor sax
- Alfred "Pee Wee" Ellis - baritone sax
- Dave Matthews - piano
- Joe Beck - guitar
- Sam Brown - guitar
- Gordon Edwards - bass
- Jimmy Madison - drums
- Sue Evans - percussion
- Fred Wesley - tambourine, background vocals
- Bobby Roach - background vocals
- Johnny Scotton - background vocals

== Samples ==
"My Thang" is also sampled on various songs, including:

- "Brand New Funk" by DJ Jazzy Jeff & The Fresh Prince
- "Funky Child" by Lords Of The Underground
- "Gotta Have It (song)" by Kanye West & Jay-Z
- Guy - "Groove Me"
- Heavy D & The Boyz - "We Got Our Own Thang"
- Bell Biv DeVoe - "Something in Your Eyes"

== In popular culture ==
- The song was featured in the 1990 psychological horror film Jacob's Ladder.

== See also ==
- List of number-one R&B singles of 1974 (U.S.)
