= Bob Both =

American recording engineer and record producer

- Born: November 10, 1952 (age 73)
- Occupations: Recording Engineer, Producer, Musician
- Years active: 1971-present
- Known for: James Brown's engineer/production supervisor
- Notable work: Recordings with James Brown "Get on the Good Foot" - "The Payback" - "Doin It to Death" - "My Thang"
- Television: James Brown "Say It Loud" A&E 2023
- Spouse: Karen Cody
- Website: soundclick.com/bobboth

Bob Both (born 1952) is an American recording engineer and record producer, best known for his work with James Brown in the 1970s.

Both was born in Bloomfield, New Jersey, the son of a carpenter, Jake Both. He moved to Oakland, NJ at age 3 and in 5th grade moved to the neighboring town of Franklin Lakes where he would live until 1975. Inspired by The Beatles, he learned to play the guitar at age 11 and started his first band in the 8th grade. He also started writing songs and making simple recordings on a home tape recorder by age 14. He attended Ramapo High School, continued writing songs and playing in bands. Bob received a publishing contract in 1969 at age 16 with Ren Maur Music for his song "Collapsing Corporation". In 1970 Bob started his own publishing company and record label, Twain Records to release his own music. He released two 45's. Later he would release several 45's by other artists on Twain records including Johnny Scottons "I'm Not Tired Yet" and the R&B cult classic "Rap On" by the Williams Brothers. When he graduated from high school in 1970 he attended The Ridgewood School of Art and studied to become a commercial artist.In his second year of school his strong interest in music led him to quit art school and search for a job in the music business.

At age 19, armed with nothing little more than a letter of recommendation from one of his art teachers, he landed a job as A&R assistant to Peter K. Seigel at Polydor Records, NYC. There Both learned the basics of record production from Seigel and the fundamentals of record mastering from Bob Ludwig who was a mastering engineer at Sterling Sound. He also began to develop his engineering skills producing mixes for James Brown.

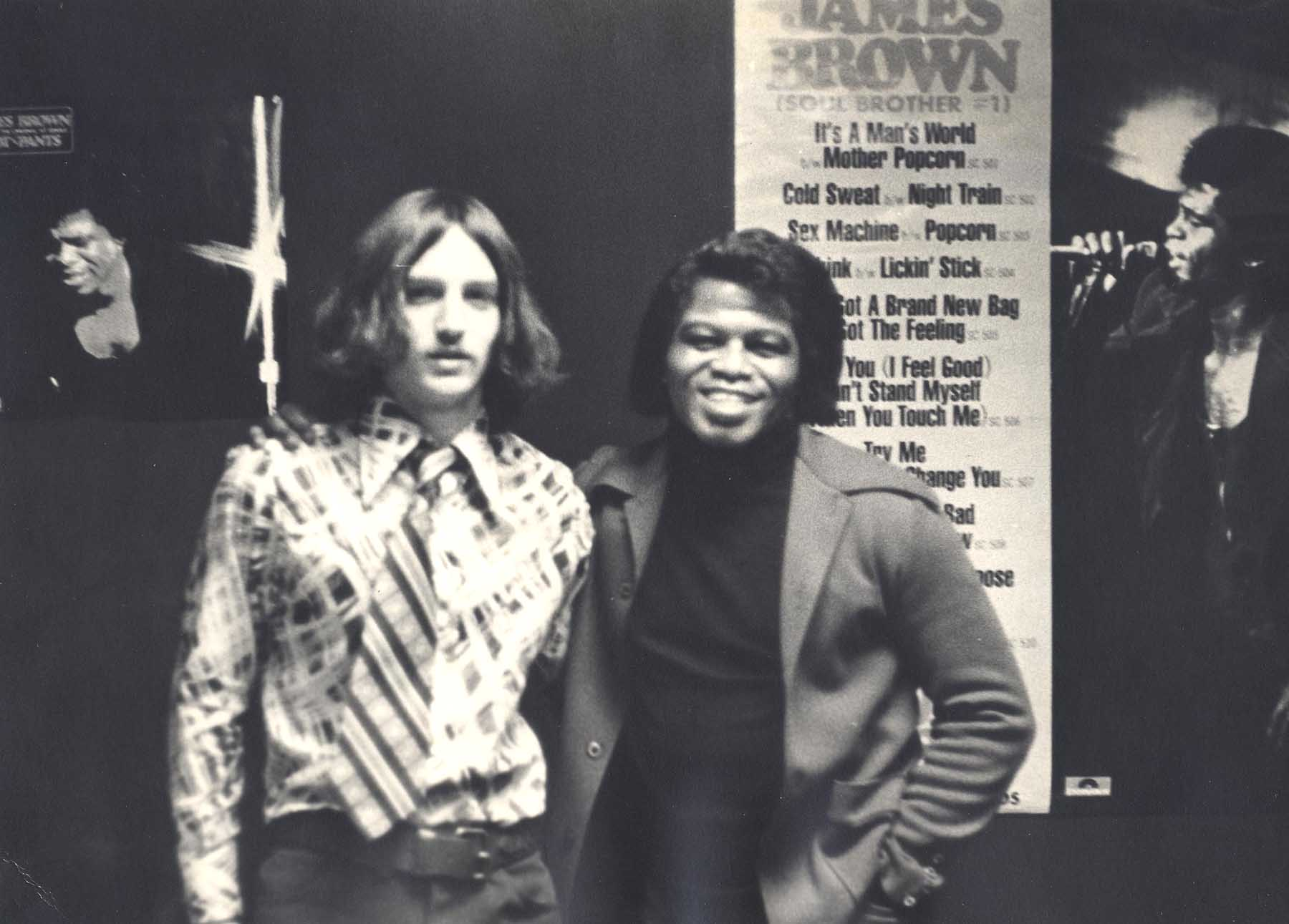
Bob Both & James Brown in Bob's office at Polydor Records in NYC 1973

In 1972 at age 20, he became James Brown's recording engineer, A&R director and production supervisor. He worked on 11 of Brown's albums including the number one hits "Get on the Good Foot", "The Payback", "My Thang" and "Doing It to Death" with Fred Wesley & the J.B.s (Brown's backup band). Bob's first project with Brown was also Brown's first double Studio album "Get On The Good Foot". Later in 1972 he mixed Brown's first motion picture soundtrack "Black Caesar" and in 1973 mixed the soundtrack to "Slaughters Big Rip-Off". 1973 also saw Both record and mix Browns #1 hit album and single "The Payback" which both went gold. In 1974 Bob traveled with Brown to Africa to record Browns performance on The Festival in Zaire. The performance can be seen in the film "Soul Power". Both also recorded 64 singles and 7 albums for artists signed to Brown's production company People Records including Hank Ballard, Maceo Parker, Lyn Collins, Bobby Byrd, Vicki Anderson The J.B's, Charles Sherell, Fred Wesley and others. (See Discography)

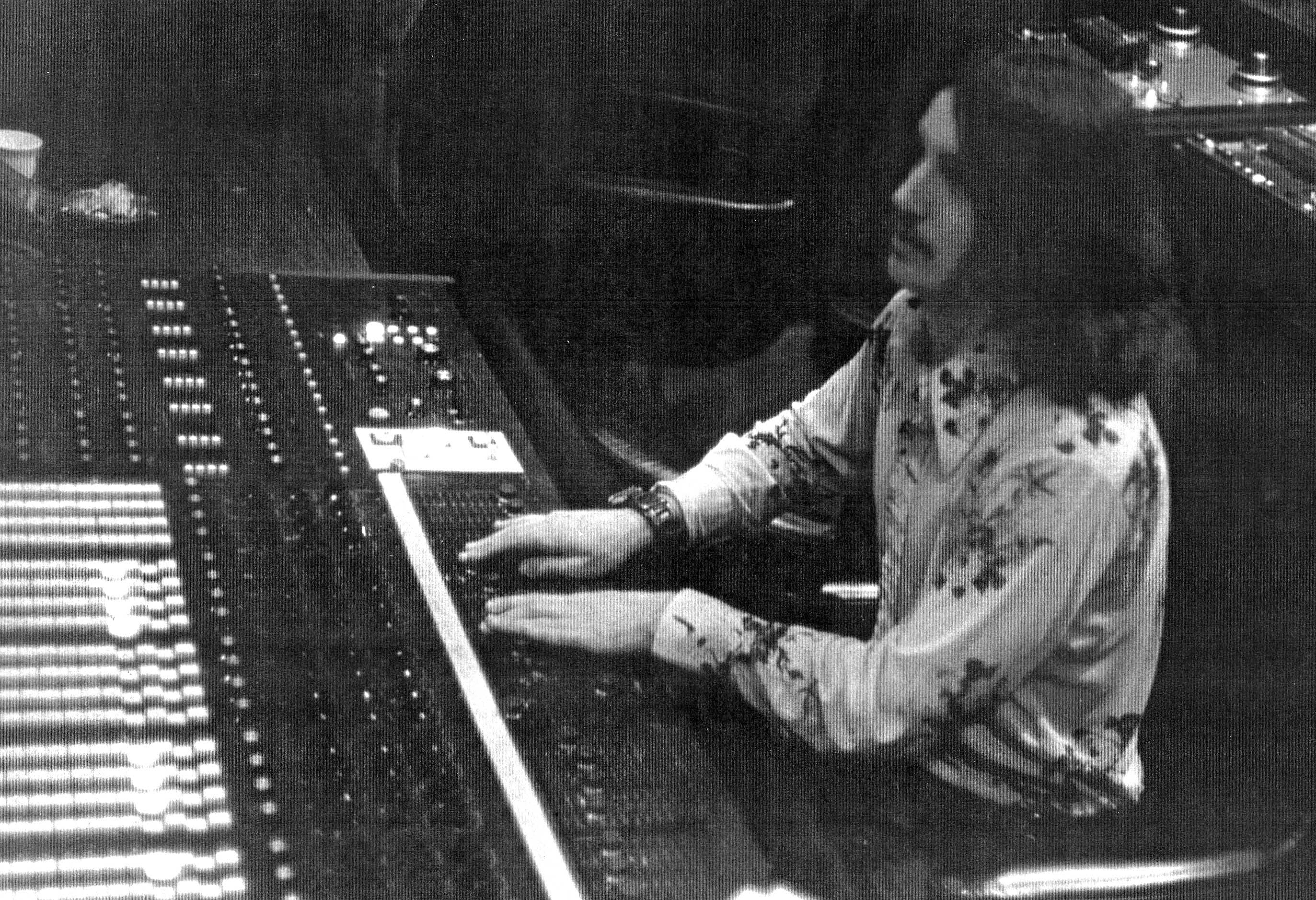
Bob Both mixing "The Payback" at Advantage studio, NYC 1973

Both left Brown in 1977, married Karen Cody and opened his own studio, Twain Recording, in West Milford, New Jersey. He has done recordings for thousands of bands in the New York, New Jersey and Pennsylvania areas such as Stephanie White & The Philth Harmonic, The Antics], The Insomniacs, Bonjee, The Disconnects, Crazy & The Brains, Mythology, Dan Sheehan Conspiracy, The Watch and many others. Both has also had years of experience recording punk rock/hardcore bands. New Jersey punk/hardcore producer Mark "The Mutha" Chesley recorded the bulk of Mutha Records catalog at Twain Recording including The Worst, Chronic Sick, Secret Syde, Tribulation, Youth in Asia, Stisism, Lost in Aggression, Fatal Rage and many more. Bob also did many notable recordings with Marty Munsch for Punk Rock Records including U.S.Chaos, NY Relix's, Dead Heros and others.

Both worked closely with Harry Weinger of Polygram Records catalog development on the re-issue of many of James Browns classic seventies albums on CD throughout the 1990s. In 1993 Both began teaching audio production courses at Ramapo College of NJ. In 1995 he also started teaching audio courses at William Paterson University Wayne, NJ. 1998 saw Bob traveling to Atlanta, Georgia to record " The J.B's Reunion " album. Both recorded the drumming technique DVD Soul of the Funky Drummers with Clyde Stubblefield and Jabo Starks in 1999 for Warner Brothers and recorded the Accelerate Your Playing DVD series for The Berklee Press in 2000. 2007 saw Bob once again reuniting with Fred Wesley to record "Funk For Your Ass" for Columbia Music. Both's work is cited in several books including The Billboard Book of Number One Rhythm & Blues Hits and Hit Me, Fred, Fred Wesley's biography. Both has written articles on recording techniques for magazines including EQ, REP, Soundtrack, Pro Music and others. He has received RIAA gold record awards for several of his James Brown recordings and is listed in The Marquis Who's Who in Entertainment. In 2023 Bob appeared on the A&E docu series James Brown "Say It Loud".

Currently Both continues to operate Twain Recording, engineering and producing records in rock, R&B, alternative and a variety of other musical styles. He performs several times a month playing guitar in a classic rock band just for the fun of making music. He also records his own songs and produces Youtube videos for them.

== Selected discography ==
1. Lyn Collins - Think About It
2. James Brown - Get On The Good Foot - Double LP - Single Certified Gold
3. James Brown - Black Caesar - Soundtrack Album
4. The J.B’S - Doin’ It To Death
5. James Brown - Slaughters Big Rip-Off - Soundtrack Album
6. James Brown - Soul Classics Volume I
7. James Brown - The Payback - Double LP- Certified Gold Album & Single
8. J.B’S - Damn Right I Am Somebody
9. Charles Sherrell - For Sweet People
10. James Brown - Hell - Double LP
11. Maceo Parker – Us
12. J.B’S - Breakin Bread
13. James Brown – Reality
14. James Brown - Sex Machine Today
15. J.B’S - Hustle With Speed
16. James Brown – Everybody’s Doin’ The Hustle
17. Lyn Collins – Check Me Out -If You Dont Know Me By Now
18. James Brown – Hot
19. James Brown - Body Heat
20. James Browns Funky People Part 1
21. James Browns Funky People Part 2
22. James Brown - Make It Funky 1971 - 1975 (2 CD Set)
23. J.B’s - Funky Good Time - The Anthology (2 CD Set)
24. James Brown - Dead On The Heavy Funk 1975 -83 (2 CD Set)
25. J.B’S - Bring The Funk On Down - The J.B’s Reunion - 1999
26. James Browns Funky People Part 3
27. The JB’s - Pass The Peas - The Best Of The JB’s
28. Fred Wesley - Funk For Your Ass - Columbia Music 2008
29. James Brown - Singles Volume 8 1972-1973
30. James Brown - Singles Volume 9 1973 - 1975
31. James Brown - Singles Volume 10 1975-1979
32. Fred Wesley - The Lost Album - 2012
33. James Brown – Get Down With James Brown Live At the Apollo 1972
