= Funky President (People It's Bad) =

1974 single by James Brown

Single by James Brown

from the album Reality
- B-side: "Coldblooded"
- Released: October 1974
- Recorded: August–September 1974, Sound Ideas, New York, NY
- Genre: Funk
- Length: 4:05
- Label: Polydor; 14258
- Songwriter: James Brown
- Producer: James Brown

James Brown charting singles chronology
"Papa Don't Take No Mess" (1974)	"Funky President (People It's Bad)" (1974)	"Coldblooded" (1974)

Audio video
- "Funky President (People It's Bad)" on YouTube

"Funky President (People It's Bad)" is a funk song by James Brown. Released as a single in 1974, it charted No. 4 R&B. It also appeared on the album Reality. According to Brown the "funky president" of the song's title was meant to refer to U.S. President Gerald Ford, who had succeeded Richard Nixon in the White House shortly before it was recorded.

== Personnel ==
- James Brown - lead vocals

=== Studio band ===
- David Sanborn - alto saxophone
- Joe Farrell - tenor saxophone, flute
- Alfred "Pee Wee" Ellis - baritone saxophone
- Pat Rebillot - keyboards
- Joe Beck - guitar
- Sam Brown - guitar
- Gordon Edwards - bass
- Allan Schwartzberg - drums
- Johnny Griggs - percussion

== Chart performance ==
Chart (1974–75)	Peak position
US Billboard Hot 100	44
US Hot Soul Singles (Billboard)	4

== Songs that sampled ==
- Eric B. & Rakim - "Eric B. Is President"/"Make 'Em Clap to This"
- MC Shan - "Kill That Noise"
- N.W.A. - "Fuck Tha Police"
- Guy - "Groove Me"
- Salt-N-Pepa - "Shake Your Thing"
- Public Enemy - "Fight the Power"
- Heavy D & the Boyz - "We Got Our Own Thang"
- Brand Nubian - "All for One"
- Ice Cube - "Jackin' for Beats"
- LL Cool J - "6 Minutes of Pleasure"
- Johnny Gill - "Rub You the Right Way"
- King Tee - "At Your Own Risk"
- Ronny Jordan - Come With Me (1993)
- Ronny Jordan - Bad Brother (1993)
- Wreckx-N-Effect - "New Jack Swing"
- UMC's - "One to Grow On"
- Kid 'N Play - "Ain't Gonna Hurt Nobody"
- Digital Underground - "Kiss You Back"
- Paperboy - "Ditty"
- Run-DMC - "Faces"
- Bebe's Kids - Freedom
- Pete Rock & C.L. Smooth feat. Grand Puba - "Skinz"
- Kris Kross - "I Missed the Bus"
- Guru - "Trust Me"
- DJ Jazzy Jeff & the Fresh Prince - "Summertime"
- Beastie Boys - "Hey Ladies"
- KRS-One - "Outta Here"
- Arts n Crafts - Surley (1990)
- Naughty by Nature - "Hip Hop Hooray"
- MC Breed - "Gotta Get Mine"
- A Tribe Called Quest - "Oh My God"
- Kid 'N Play - "Last Night"
- DJ Jazzy Jeff & the Fresh Prince - "I'm Looking for the One (To Be with Me)"
- Digital Underground - "Wussup Wit the Luv"
- Usher - "Call Me a Mack"
- Black Eyed Peas and Q-Tip feat. Talib Kweli, Cee-Lo Green and John Legend - "Like That"
- Tony! Toni! Toné! - "Feels Good"
- The D.O.C. - "It's Funky Enough"
- Heavy D & the Boyz - "Blue Funk"
- Poor Righteous Teachers - "Rock Dis Funky Joint"
- Del the Funky Homosapien - "If You Must"
- Kanye West, Jay-Z & Big Sean - "Clique"
- Rick Ross feat. Kanye West - "Live Fast, Die Young"
- Pusha T and Kanye West - "New God Flow"
- Kanye West feat. Pusha T - "Runaway (Video Version)"
- Michel'le feat. Dr. Dre - "Nicety"
- Ghostface Killah - "Mighty Healthy"
- Nice & Smooth - "Sex, Sex, Sex"
- Mic Geronimo feat. Ja Rule, Jay-Z, and DMX - "Time to Build"
- DJ Jazzy Jeff & The Fresh Prince - The Fresh Prince of Bel-Air Outro
- Childish Gambino - "3005"
- DJ Shadow and Cut Chemist - "Funky"
- Sugar Ray - "Falls Apart"
- Yolanda Adams - "Fly Like An Eagle (Medley)"
- De La Soul - "Freedom of Speak (We Got Eight Minutes)"
- De La Soul - "Ghetto Thang"
- LL Cool J - "Fast Peg"
- LL Cool J - "Ain't No Stoppin' This"
- Heavy D and the Boyz - "Gyrlz, They Love Me"
- Logic - "We Get High"
- Cella Dwellas - "Perfect Match"
- Run the Jewels - "Get It"
- Big Sean - "Ashley"
- Spoonie Gee - "Spoonie Is Back"
- The X-Ecutioners feat. DJ Premier - "Premier's X-Ecution"
- Large Professor - "I Juswanna Chill"
- Pete Rock feat. Black Thought and Rob-O - "It's About That Time"
- 2Pac feat. Richie Rich - "Lie to Kick It"
- Lord Finesse - "True and Livin'"
- Logic - "The Spotlight"
- Pete Rock feat. C.L. Smooth - "Da Two"
- Gang Starr - "Gotta Get Over (Taking Loot)"
- A Tribe Called Quest - "Show Business"
- The Offspring - "Original Prankster"
- DJ Kay Slay feat. Fat Joe and 50 Cent - "Free Again"
- Gang Starr - "Knowledge"
- Violadores del Verso - "Mierda"
- Shanice - "I Love Your Smile (Driza Bone Club Mix)"
- Citizen King - "Better Days (And the Bottom Drops Out)"
- Calvin Harris - "C.U.B.A"

== Appearances in other media ==
"Funky President" appears on the Grand Theft Auto: San Andreas soundtrack on the Master Sounds 98.3 station.
