= Starday-King Sound Studios =

Recording studio in Nashville

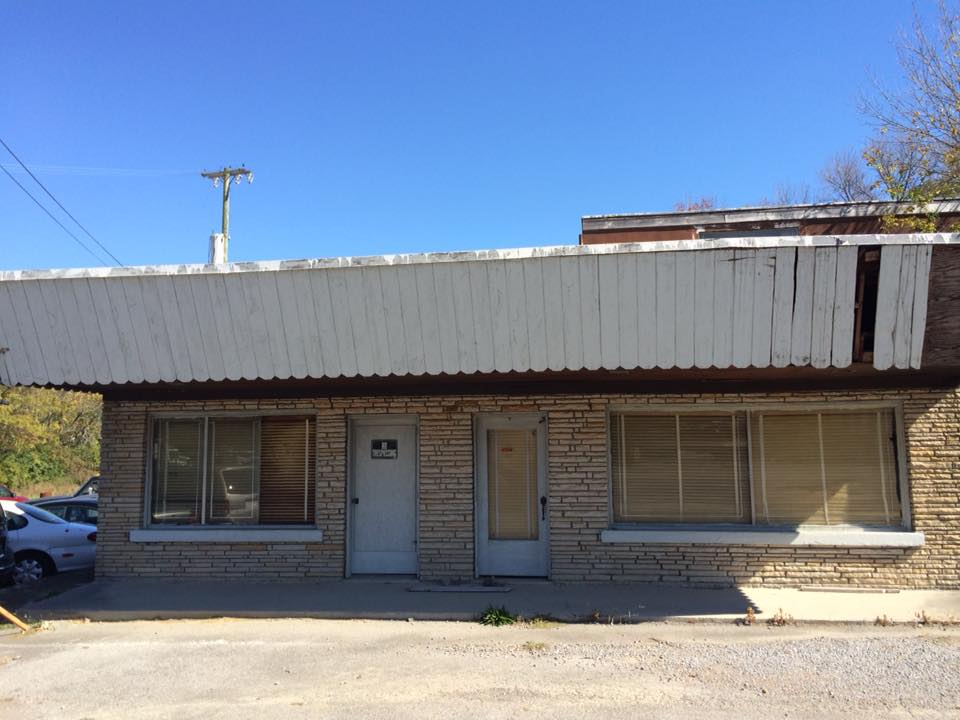
- Starday-King Sound Studios
- Location: 3557 Dickerson Pike; Nashville, Tennessee 37207
- Built: 1960
- Demolished: 2022

Starday-King Sound Studios was a recording studio in the Madison neighborhood in northeast Nashville, Tennessee.

== History ==
Built in 1960, Starday Sound once was one of the city's busiest studios, with artists including James Brown, Dottie West and Jim Reeves recording there.

When the studio opened as Starday Sound in May 1960, it was Nashville's third commercial recording studio, after RCA Studios and Bradley Film and Recording Studio. Unlike those studios, it was not located in what was to become known as Music Row but in Madison, Tennessee, a bedroom community in northeast Davidson County.

The building shared space with Starday Records president Don Pierce's publishing company. In 1963, Pierce ran a mail order distribution company, The Country Music Record Club of America, out of the building, with a warehouse built onto the existing building.

Many of Starday Records' top acts, including Red Sovine and Cowboy Copas, recorded hits at Starday Sound, but the studio hosted more than country artists. For instance, Jimi Hendrix played guitar on a handful of R&B sessions there during the mid-1960s. When Starday Sound's parent company acquired King Records after label founder Syd Nathan's death in 1968, the studio became known as Starday-King Sound.

James Brown recorded some of his biggest hits at the studio, beginning with "Get Up (I Feel Like Being a) Sex Machine", cut in the early hours of April 26, 1970, after Brown wrote the song backstage following a Nashville concert the previous night. Brown also recorded "Super Bad", "Hot Pants", "I'm a Greedy Man" and several other songs there between 1970 and 1975.

== Preservation ==
In 2016, the mid-century modern building, which has sat vacant since 2000, was named to Historic Nashville's Nashville Nine, a list of properties endangered by demolition, neglect or development. There were petitions and an organized effort to save the studio; however, the studio was demolished in August 2022.

== List of artists recorded ==
Following is a list of some notable artists who recorded songs at Starday-King Sound Studios.

- Archie Campbell
- Arthur Prysock
- Cowboy Copas
- Dottie West
- The Stoneman Family
- Fiddlin' Arthur Smith
- Frank Gorshin
- James Brown
- Jim Reeves
- Minnie Pearl
- Red Sovine
- The Duke of Paducah
- The Oak Ridge Quartet

== See also ==
- Starday Records
