= Sweet Charles Sherrell =

American bassist (1943–2023)

- Also known as: Sweet Charles & Sweets
- Born: Charles Sherrell; March 8, 1943; Nashville, Tennessee, US
- Died: March 29, 2023 (aged 80)
- Genres: R&B, funk, soul
- Instruments: Electric bass, clavinet, keyboards, guitar
- Label: People

Charles Emanuel Sherrell (March 8, 1943 – March 29, 2023) was an American bassist known for recording and performing with James Brown. He was a member of The J.B.'s from 1973 to 1996.

== Biography ==
Born in Nashville, Tennessee, Charles Sherrell began his career playing drums with fellow Nashville residents Jimi Hendrix and Billy Cox, practicing at a club a block from Hendrix's residence. Sherrell learned to play the guitar by washing the car (a Jaguar) of Curtis Mayfield in exchange for guitar lessons. Sherrell soon began teaching himself to play the bass after buying one from a local pawn shop for $69, which led him to join Johnny Jones & The King Kasuals Band, Aretha Franklin's backing group.

Sherrell joined James Brown's band in August 1968, replacing Tim Drummond after Drummond contracted hepatitis in Vietnam. He played on some of Brown's most famous recordings of the late 1960s, including the #1 R&B hits "Say It Loud - I'm Black and I'm Proud", "Mother Popcorn", and "Give It Up or Turnit a Loose" and more. Brown credited him with being his first bassist to incorporate playing techniques such as thumping on the strings that were adopted by other players, including Bootsy Collins. In the 1970s, Sherrell rejoined Brown and performed with The J.B.'s. He later played with Al Green and Maceo & All the King's Men. He played bass on Beau Dollar's Who knows, Marva Whitney's and Lyn Collins album. He sang on a few of Maceo Parker's albums. He also released some recordings with the band Past Present & Future with friends Wade Conklin, Sam Pugh, Ted Hughes, Gail Whitefield, Thomas Smith, and James Nixon and he recorded under the name Sweet Charles, including his first solo album, Sweet Charles: For Sweet People, on James Brown's label People Records and the Sweet Charles Sherrell Universal Love album in 2017.

Sherrell died of lung emphysema on March 29, 2023, at his home in The Netherlands.

== Discography ==
=== As leader ===
- For Sweet People from Sweet Charles (1974)
- Universal Love (2017)

=== As sideman ===
- James Brown: Say It Loud – I'm Black and I'm Proud (1969)
- James Brown: It's a New Day – Let a Man Come In (1970)
- James Brown: Get Up Offa That Thing (1976)
