= James Brown discography =

Cataloging of published recordings by James Brown

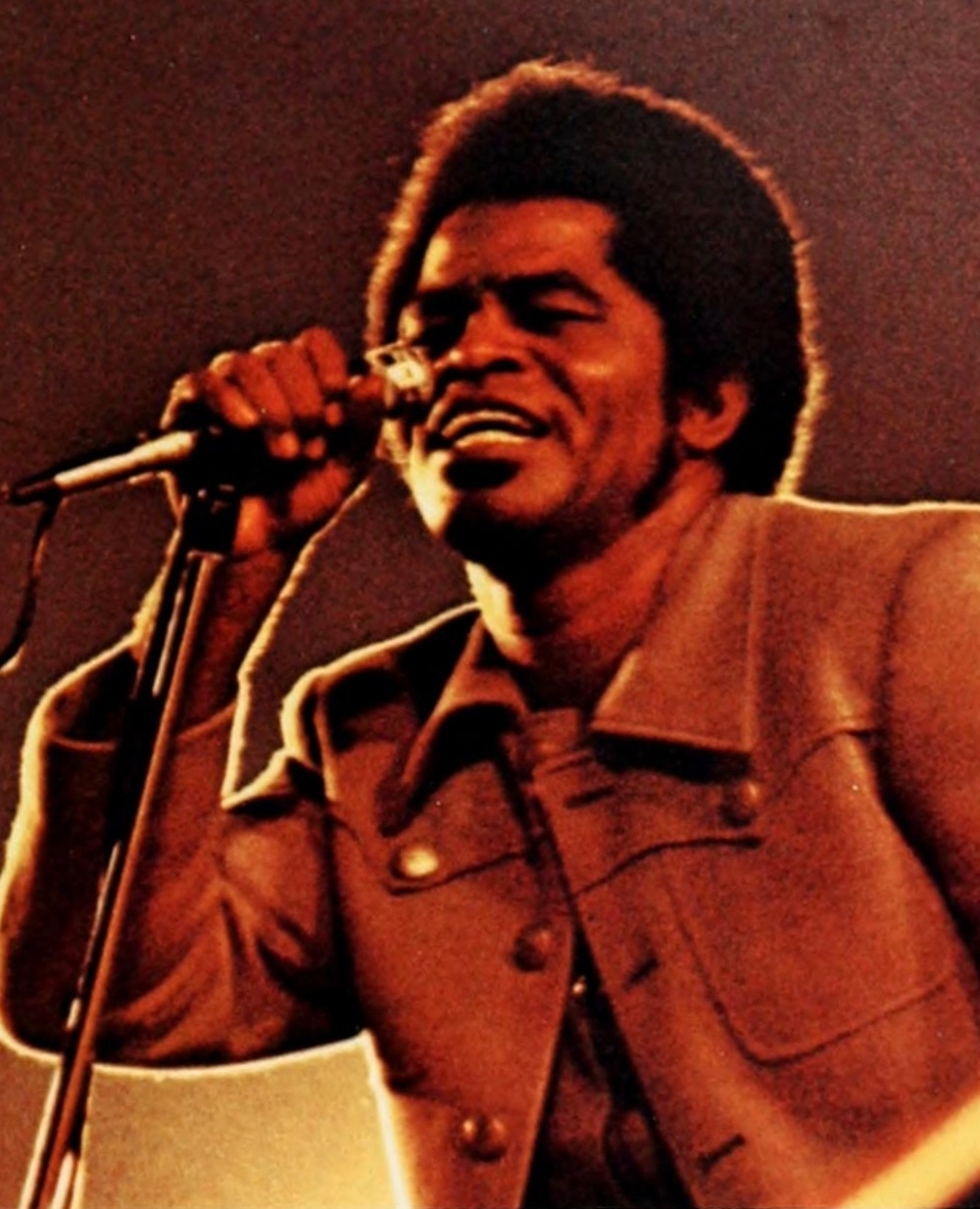
- James Brown performing in 1970
- Studio albums: 59
- Soundtrack albums: 2
- Live albums: 15
- Compilation albums: 49
- Singles: 144
- Video albums: 7
- Music videos: 10

This is a discography chronicling the musical career of James Brown. Brown joined Bobby Byrd's vocal group the Flames in 1953, first as a drummer and then as leading front man. Later becoming the Famous Flames, they signed with Federal Records in 1956 and recorded their first hit single, "Please, Please, Please", which sold over a million copies.

After the hit release of "Try Me", following nine relative failures, the group scored a series of hit albums and recordings in the early 1960s. Brown's solo aspirations started around 1962. By the time of "Papa's Got a Brand New Bag", he used the Flames less and less as he became a full-fledged solo artist who was now involved in the development of a new R&B subgenre, funk. Eventually the Famous Flames left him in 1968 as did his James Brown band by 1970 and Brown hired The J.B.'s who helped contribute to his continuing success in the 1970s. After their disbanding, Brown struggled for a number of years with recordings before the release of 1985's "Living in America", and having success with the albums Gravity (1986) and I'm Real (1988).

Between 1958 and 1986, Brown charted at least 93 entries on the Billboard Hot 100 and 115 entries on the R&B chart between 1956 and 1993. Seventeen of Brown's singles, including five credited as "James Brown and the Famous Flames", hit number-one on the R&B chart. He recorded several more hits pseudonymously, notably "(Do the) Mashed Potatoes" and "Doing It to Death". In addition to his own hits, Brown wrote and produced charting records by many other performers, including Bobby Byrd, Hank Ballard, Tammy Montgomery, Lyn Collins, Marva Whitney, and The J.B.'s. In contrast to his chart success, few of Brown's hit recordings were certified by the RIAA, partly due to the reluctance of his record labels to pay the required fees. He had just two certified gold singles - "Get on the Good Foot" (1972) and "The Payback" (1974) - and one gold album, 1973's The Payback. However, two 1991 compilations of his work earned RIAA certification: Star Time (gold) and 20 All-Time Greatest Hits! (platinum).

Brown is one of a handful of artists to chart a combined 1,000 weeks on the US Billboard charts, with Brown accumulating a total of 1,459 cumulative weeks, with 795 weeks on the Billboard 200 and 664 weeks on the Billboard Hot 100.

== Albums ==
=== Studio albums ===
| Title | Album details | Peak chart positions | | | | | Certifications |
| Title | Album details | US | US R&B | CAN | SWI | UK | Certifications |
|---|---|---|---|---|---|---|---|
| Please Please Please (James Brown and The Famous Flames) | Released: December 1958; Label: King | — | — | — | — | — | |
| Try Me! (James Brown and The Famous Flames) | Released: July 1959; Label: King | — | — | — | — | — | |
| Think! (James Brown and The Famous Flames) | Released: November 1960; Label: King | — | — | — | — | — | |
| The Amazing James Brown and The Famous Flames (James Brown and The Famous Flames) | Released: May 1961; Label: King | — | — | — | — | — | |
| James Brown and His Famous Flames Tour the U.S.A. (James Brown and The Famous Flames) | Released: September 1962; Label: King | — | — | — | — | — | |
| Prisoner of Love | Released: September 1963; Label: King | 73 | — | — | — | — | |
| Showtime | Released: April 1964; Label: Smash | 61 | — | — | — | — | |
| Grits & Soul | Released: August 1964; Label: Smash | 124 | 9 | — | — | — | |
| Out of Sight | Released: September 1964; Label: Smash | 65 | 7 | — | — | — | |
| James Brown Plays James Brown Today & Yesterday | Released: November 1965; Label: Smash | 42 | 3 | — | — | — | |
| James Brown Plays New Breed (The Boo-Ga-Loo) | Released: March 1966; Label: Smash | 101 | 27 | — | — | — | |
| Handful of Soul | Released: November 1966; Label: Smash | 135 | 24 | — | — | — | |
| James Brown Sings Christmas Songs | Released: November 1966; Label: King | — | — | — | — | — | |
| James Brown Sings Raw Soul | Released: March 1967; Label: King | 88 | 14 | — | — | — | |
| James Brown Plays the Real Thing | Released: June 1967; Label: Smash | 164 | 27 | — | — | — | |
| Cold Sweat (James Brown and The Famous Flames) | Released: August 1967; Label: King | 35 | 5 | — | — | — | |
| I Can't Stand Myself When You Touch Me | Released: March 1968; Label: King | 17 | 4 | — | — | — | |
| I Got the Feelin' | Released: April 1968; Label: King | 135 | 23 | — | — | — | |
| James Brown Plays Nothing But Soul | Released: August 1968; Label: King | 150 | 28 | — | — | — | |
| Thinking About Little Willie John and a Few Nice Things | Released: November 1968; Label: King | — | — | — | — | — | |
| A Soulful Christmas | Released: November 1968; Label: King | — | — | — | — | — | |
| Say It Loud – I'm Black and I'm Proud | Released: March 1969; Label: King | 53 | 6 | — | — | — | |
| Gettin' Down to It | Released: May 1969; Label: King | 99 | 26 | — | — | — | |
| The Popcorn | Released: August 1969; Label: King | 148 | 31 | — | — | — | |
| It's a Mother | Released: August 1969; Label: King | 26 | 3 | 49 | — | — | |
| Ain't It Funky | Released: January 1970; Label: King | 43 | 5 | — | — | — | |
| Soul on Top | Released: April 1970; Label: King | 125 | 12 | — | — | — | |
| It's a New Day – Let a Man Come In | Released: June 1970; Label: King | 121 | 19 | — | — | — | |
| Hey America | Released: December 1970; Label: King | — | — | — | — | — | |
| Sho Is Funky Down Here | Released: April 1971; Label: King | 137 | 26 | — | — | — | |
| Hot Pants | Released: August 1971; Label: Polydor | 22 | 4 | — | — | — | |
| There It Is | Released: June 9, 1972; Label: Polydor | 60 | 10 | — | — | — | |
| Get on the Good Foot | Released: October 27, 1972; Label: Polydor | 68 | 8 | — | — | — | |
| Black Caesar | Released: February 1973; Label: Polydor | 31 | 2 | — | — | — | |
| Slaughter's Big Rip-Off | Released: September 1973; Label: Polydor | 92 | 15 | — | — | — | |
| The Payback | Released: January 1974; Label: Polydor | 34 | 1 | 92 | — | — | US: Gold |
| Hell | Released: June 28, 1974; Label: Polydor | 35 | 2 | 78 | — | — | |
| Reality | Released: December 19, 1974; Label: Polydor | 56 | 11 | — | — | — | |
| Sex Machine Today | Released: March 1975; Label: Polydor | 103 | 24 | 60 | — | — | |
| Everybody's Doin' the Hustle & Dead on the Double Bump | Released: August 1975; Label: Polydor | 193 | 31 | — | — | — | |
| Hot | Released: January 1976; Label: Polydor | 198 | 35 | — | — | — | |
| Get Up Offa That Thing | Released: July 1976; Label: Polydor | 147 | 14 | 12 | — | — | |
| Bodyheat | Released: December 1976; Label: Polydor | 126 | 20 | — | — | — | |
| Mutha's Nature | Released: July 22, 1977; Label: Polydor | — | 38 | — | — | — | |
| Jam 1980's | Released: March 1978; Label: Polydor | 121 | 32 | — | — | — | |
| Take a Look at Those Cakes | Released: November 1978; Label: Polydor | — | 55 | — | — | — | |
| The Original Disco Man | Released: June 1979; Label: Polydor | 152 | 37 | — | — | — | |
| People | Released: February 1980; Label: Polydor | — | — | — | — | — | |
| Soul Syndrome | Released: November 1980; Label: TK | — | 63 | — | — | — | |
| Nonstop! | Released: April 1981; Label: Polydor | — | — | — | — | — | |
| Bring It On! | Released: May 1983; Label: Augusta Sound | — | — | — | — | — | |
| Gravity | Released: September 15, 1986; Label: Scotti Brothers | 156 | 38 | — | — | 85 | |
| I'm Real | Released: 1988; Label: Scotti Brothers | 96 | 15 | — | 19 | 27 | |
| Love Over-Due | Released: July 23, 1991; Label: Scotti Brothers | — | 51 | — | 35 | — | |
| Universal James | Released: March 9, 1993; Label: Scotti Brothers | — | — | — | 34 | — | |
| I'm Back | Released: November 17, 1998; Label: Inferno | — | — | — | — | — | |
| The Merry Christmas Album | Released: November 16, 1999; Label: Waxworks | — | — | — | — | — | |
| The Next Step | Released: August 27, 2002; Label: Fome | — | 72 | — | — | — | |
"—" denotes items that did not chart or were not released in that territory.

=== Compilation albums ===
| Title | Album details | Peak chart positions | | | | | Certifications |
| Title | Album details | US | US R&B | NED | SWI | UK | Certifications |
|---|---|---|---|---|---|---|---|
| Twist Around | Released: March 1962; Label: King | — | — | — | — | — | |
| Good, Good, Twistin' | Released: July 1962; Label: King | — | — | — | — | — | |
| Papa's Got a Brand New Bag | Released: August 1965; Label: King | 26 | 2 | — | — | — | |
| I Got You (I Feel Good) | Released: January 1966; Label: King | 36 | 3 | — | — | — | |
| Mighty Instrumentals | Released: 1966; Label: King | — | — | — | — | — | |
| It's a Man's Man's Man's World | Released: August 1966; Label: King | 90 | 8 | — | — | — | |
| Soul Classics | Released: 1972; Label: Polydor | 83 | 13 | — | — | — | |
| Soul Classics, Volume II | Released: 1973; Label: Polydor | — | 31 | — | — | — | |
| Solid Gold, 30 Golden Hits | Released: 1977; Label: Polydor | — | — | — | — | — | |
| The Fabulous James Brown | Released: 1977; Label: HRB Music Company | — | — | — | — | — | |
| Can Your Heart Stand It? | Released: 1981; Label: Solid Smoke | — | — | — | — | — | |
| The Best of James Brown | Released: 1981; Label: Polydor | — | — | — | — | — | |
| The Federal Years, Part I | Released: 1984; Label: King | — | — | — | — | — | |
| The Federal Years, Part II | Released: 1984; Label: King | — | — | — | — | — | |
| Roots of a Revolution, 1956–1965 | Released: 1984; Label: Polydor | — | — | — | — | — | |
| Ain't That a Groove, 1966–1969 | Released: 1984; Label: Polydor | — | — | — | — | — | |
| Doing It to Death, 1970–1973 | Released: 1984; Label: Polydor | — | — | — | — | — | |
| Dead on the Heavy Funk, 1974–1976 | Released: 1985; Label: Polydor | — | — | — | — | — | |
| The CD of JB: (Sex Machine and Other Soul Classics) | Released: 1985; Label: Polydor | — | — | — | — | — | |
| In the Jungle Groove | Released: August 1986; Label: Polydor | — | — | — | — | — | |
| The CD of JB II, Cold Sweat and Other Soul Classics | Released: 1987; Label: Polydor | — | — | — | — | — | |
| The Best of James Brown | Released: October 1987; Label: K-tel | — | — | — | — | 17 | UK: Gold |
| Motherlode | Released: 1988; Label: Polydor | — | — | — | — | — | |
| The Great James Brown, Soul Brother Number One | Released: 1988; Label: Polydor | — | — | 33 | — | — | |
| Dance Machine | Released: 1990; Label: Polydor | — | — | — | — | — | |
| Messin' with the Blues | Released: 1990; Label: Polydor | — | — | — | — | — | |
| Star Time | Released: May 7, 1991; Label: Polydor | — | 89 | — | — | — | US: Gold |
| 20 All-Time Greatest Hits! | Released: October 22, 1991; Label: Polydor | 133 | 99 | — | — | — | US: Platinum |
| Sex Machine: The Very Best of James Brown | Released: November 1991; Label: Polydor | — | — | — | — | 19 | UK: Gold |
| Greatest Hits of the Fourth Decade | Released: 1992; Label: Attic | — | — | — | — | — | |
| Living in America | Released: 1995; Label: Polydor | — | — | — | — | — | |
| Roots of a Revolution 1956–1963 | Released: 1995; Label: Polydor | — | — | — | — | — | |
| James Brown's Funky Christmas | Released: 1995; Label: Polydor | — | — | — | — | — | |
| Foundations of Funk, A Brand New Bag, 1964–1969 | Released: March 19, 1996; Label: Polydor | — | — | — | — | — | |
| Funk Power 1970, A Brand New Thang | Released: June 4, 1996; Label: Polydor | — | — | — | — | — | |
| Make It Funky, The Big Payback, 1971–1975 | Released: July 23, 1996; Label: Polydor | — | — | — | — | — | |
| JB40 – 40th Anniversary Collection | Released: October 8, 1996; Label: Polydor | — | — | — | — | — | |
| Dead on the Heavy Funk, 1975–1983 | Released: 1998; Label: Polydor | — | — | — | — | — | |
| 20th Century Masters – The Millennium Collection: The Best of James Brown | Released: 1998; Label: Polydor | — | — | — | — | — | |
| Classic James Brown, Universal Masters Collection | Released: 2001; Label: Polydor | — | — | — | — | — | |
| 20th Century Masters – The Millennium Collection: The Best of James Brown, Vol. 2: The 70's | Released: January 2002; Label: Polydor | — | — | — | — | — | |
| The Godfather: The Very Best of James Brown | Released: March 2002; Label: Universal | — | — | — | 61 | 30 | UK: Gold |
| Classic James Brown, Volume II, Universal Masters Collection | Released: 2003; Label: Polydor | — | — | — | — | — | |
| 20th Century Masters, The Christmas Collection | Released: 2003; Label: Polydor | — | — | — | — | — | |
| 50th Anniversary Collection | Released: 2003; Label: Universal | — | — | — | — | — | |
| The Singles, Volume I: The Federal Years, 1956–1960 | Released: September 1, 2006; Label: Hip-O | — | — | — | — | — | |
| The Singles, Volume II: 1960–1963 | Released: March 27, 2007; Label: Hip-O | — | — | — | — | — | |
| The Singles, Volume III: 1964–1965 | Released: June 8, 2007; Label: Hip-O | — | — | — | — | — | |
| A Family Affair (with daughters Yamma and Venisha) | Released: 2007; Label: Let Them Eat Vinyl | — | — | — | — | — | |
| The Singles, Volume IV: 1966–1967 | Released: October 19, 2007; Label: Hip-O | — | — | — | — | — | |
| Number 1's | Released: 2007; Label: Universal | — | — | — | — | — | |
| Soul Brother No. 1 | Released: 2008; Label: Universal | 170 | — | — | — | — | |
| The Singles, Volume V: 1967–1969 | Released: April 1, 2008; Label: Hip-O | — | — | — | — | — | |
| The Singles, Volume VI: 1969–1970 | Released: December 5, 2008; Label: Hip-O | — | — | — | — | — | |
| The Singles, Volume VII: 1970–1972 | Released: May 26, 2009; Label: Hip-O | — | — | — | — | — | |
| The Singles, Volume VIII: 1972–1973 | Released: December 21, 2009; Label: Hip-O | — | — | — | — | — | |
| Icon | Released: 2010; Label: Polydor | — | — | — | — | — | |
| The Singles, Volume IX: 1973–1975 | Released: July 2, 2010; Label: Hip-O | — | — | — | — | — | |
| The Complete James Brown Christmas | Released: October 12, 2010; Label: Hip-O | — | — | — | — | — | |
| The Singles, Volume X: 1975–1979 | Released: February 11, 2011; Label: Hip-O | — | — | — | — | — | |
| The Singles, Volume XI: 1979–1981 | Released: October 11, 2011; Label: Hip-O | — | — | — | — | — | |
| Get On Up, The James Brown Story | Released: July 18, 2014; Label: Polydor | 61 | 9 | — | — | — | |
"—" denotes items that did not chart or were not released in that territory.

=== Live albums ===
| Title | Album details | Peak chart positions | | | | Notes |
| Title | Album details | US | US R&B | GER | NED | Notes |
|---|---|---|---|---|---|---|
| Live at the Apollo (James Brown and The Famous Flames) | Recorded: October 24, 1962; Released: May 1963; Label: King | 2 | — | — | — | Re-sequenced and re-released with bonus tracks in 2004 |
| Pure Dynamite!, Live at the Royal (James Brown and The Famous Flames) | Recorded: November 15, 1963; Released: 1964; Label: King | 10 | — | — | — | Includes 2 studio tracks with overdubbed audience |
| The James Brown Show | Recorded: April 24, 1966; Released: January 1967; Label: Smash | — | — | — | — | Partly live |
| Live at the Garden (James Brown and The Famous Flames) | Recorded: January 14, 1967; Released: May 1967; Label: King | 41 | 6 | — | — | Includes one studio track with overdubbed audience; re-sequenced and re-released with bonus tracks in 2009 |
| Live at the Apollo, Volume II (James Brown and The Famous Flames) | Recorded: June 24–25, 1967; Released: August 1968; Label: King | 32 | 2 | 32 | 19 | Double LP; re-sequenced and re-released with unreleased and extended performances in 2001 |
| Sex Machine | Recorded: October 1, 1969; Released: September 1970; Label: King | 29 | 4 | — | — | Double LP; 1st record contains studio tracks overdubbed with audience; 2nd record contains live concert with one studio track overdubbed with audience |
| Super Bad | Released: c. January 1971; Label: King | 61 | 4 | — | — | Features studio tracks with overdubbed audience. |
| Revolution of the Mind, Live at the Apollo, Volume III | Recorded: July 24–26, 1971; Released: December 1971; Label: Polydor | 39 | 7 | — | — | Double LP |
| Hot on the One | Recorded: December 1979; Released: July 1980; Label: Polydor | — | — | — | — | Double LP |
| Live in New York | Recorded: March 26, 1980; Released: 1981; Label: Knockout | — | — | — | — | Double LP; includes two studio instrumentals by the Bay Ridge Band |
| Live at Chastain Park | Recorded: January 1, 1985; Released: 1988; Label: Charly | — | — | — | — | |
| Soul Session Live | Recorded: January 9–10, 1987; Released: 1989; Label: Scotti Brothers | — | — | — | 46 | Includes one studio duet with Aretha Franklin |
| Love, Power, Peace, Live at the Olympia, Paris 1971 | Recorded: March 8, 1971; Released: August 23, 1992; Label: Polydor | — | — | — | — | Previously unreleased concert, edited down for a single CD. The full show was released in 2014 as a triple LP |
| Live at the Apollo 1995 | Recorded: September 1994; Released: July 18, 1995; Label: Scotti Brothers | — | — | — | — | Includes two studio tracks |
| Say It Live and Loud, Live in Dallas 08.26.68 | Recorded: August 26, 1968; Released: August 11, 1998; Label: PolyGram | — | — | — | — | Previously unreleased |
| Get Down With James Brown: Live At The Apollo Vol. IV | Recorded: September 13–14, 1972; Released: April 16, 2016; Label: Polydor | — | 45 | — | — | Double LP; features two performances by Brown. The JB's, Bobby Byrd, and Lyn Collins are spotlighted on this record. |
| Live at Home with His Bad Self | Recorded: October 1, 1969; Released: October 25, 2019; Label: Republic | — | — | — | — | |
"—" denotes items that did not chart or were not released in that territory.

== Singles discography ==
(Note) Listed below are the charting singles James Brown released on the King Records subsidiary Federal and King record labels, and Smash Records . Most of the songs also feature The Famous Flames on backing vocals through 1965. Brown had recorded singles for Bethlehem and Ember Records alternatively.

=== 1956–1971 ===
| Year | Titles (A-side, B-side) Both sides from same album except where indicated | Peak chart positions | | | | | | | | Certifications | Album |
| Year | Titles (A-side, B-side) Both sides from same album except where indicated | US | US R&B | BEL | CAN | GER | ITA | NED | UK | Certifications | Album |
|---|---|---|---|---|---|---|---|---|---|---|---|
Federal releases:
| 1956 | "Please, Please, Please" b/w "Why Do You Do Me" (from Try Me!) | — | 5 | — | — | — | — | — | — | | Please Please Please |
| 1956 | "I Don't Know" b/w "I Feel That Old Feeling Coming On" | — | — | — | — | — | — | — | — | | Please Please Please |
| 1956 | "No, No, No, No" b/w "Hold My Baby's Hand" | — | — | — | — | — | — | — | — | | Please Please Please |
| 1956 | "Chonnie-On-Chon" b/w "I Won't Plead No More" (from Try Me!) | — | — | — | — | — | — | — | — | | Please Please Please |
| 1957 | "Just Won't Do Right" b/w "Let's Make It" | — | — | — | — | — | — | — | — | | Please Please Please |
| 1957 | "Gonna Try" b/w "Can't Be the Same" | — | — | — | — | — | — | — | — | | Try Me! |
| 1957 | "Messing with the Blues" b/w "Love or a Game" (from Please, Please, Please) | — | — | — | — | — | — | — | — | | Try Me! |
| 1957 | "You're Mine, You're Mine" b/w "I Walked Alone" (from Please, Please, Please) | — | — | — | — | — | — | — | — | | Try Me! |
| 1957 | "That Dood It" b/w "Baby Cries Over the Ocean" | — | — | — | — | — | — | — | — | | Please, Please, Please |
| 1958 | "Begging, Begging" b/w "That's When I Lost My Heart" | — | — | — | — | — | — | — | — | | Please, Please, Please |
| 1958 | "Try Me" b/w "Tell Me What I Did Wrong" | 48 | 1 | — | — | — | — | — | — | | Please, Please, Please |
| 1959 | "I Want You So Bad" b/w "There Must Be a Reason" | — | 20 | — | — | — | — | — | — | | Try Me! |
| 1959 | "I've Got to Change" b/w "It Hurts to Tell You" | — | — | — | — | — | — | — | — | | Try Me! |
| 1959 | "It Was You" b/w "Got to Cry" | — | — | — | — | — | — | — | — | | Try Me! |
| 1959 | "Good Good Lovin'" b/w "Don't Let It Happen to Me" (from Try Me!) | — | — | — | — | — | — | — | — | | Think! |
| 1960 | "I'll Go Crazy" b/w "I Know It's True" | — | 15 | — | — | — | — | — | — | | Think! |
| 1960 | "Think" / | 33 | 7 | — | — | — | — | — | — | | Think! |
| 1960 | "You've Got the Power" | 86 | 14 | — | — | — | — | — | — | | Think! |
| 1960 | "This Old Heart" b/w "Wonder When You're Coming Home" | 79 | 20 | — | — | — | — | — | — | | Think! |
| 1960 | King releases: | | | | | | | | | | |
| 1960 | "The Bells" b/w "And I Do Just What I Want" | 68 | — | — | — | — | — | — | — | | The Amazing James Brown |
| 1961 | "Hold It" b/w "The Scratch" (from Twist Around/Mighty Instrumentals) | — | — | — | — | — | — | — | — | | Twist Around |
| 1961 | "Bewildered" b/w "If You Want Me" | 40 | 8 | — | — | — | — | — | — | | Think! |
| 1961 | "I Don't Mind" b/w "Love Don't Love Nobody" | 47 | 4 | — | — | — | — | — | — | | The Amazing James Brown |
| 1961 | "Suds" b/w "Sticky" (from Tour the U.S.A.) | — | — | — | — | — | — | — | — | | Twist Around/Mighty Instrumentals |
| 1961 | "Baby You're Right" b/w "I'll Never, Never Let You Go" | 49 | 2 | — | — | — | — | — | — | | Think! |
| 1961 | "Just You and Me, Darling" b/w "I Love You, Yes I Do" | — | 17 | — | — | — | — | — | — | | The Amazing James Brown |
| 1961 | "Lost Someone" b/w "Cross Firing" (from Tour the U.S.A.) | 48 | 2 | — | — | — | — | — | — | | The Amazing James Brown |
| 1962 | "Night Train" b/w "Why Does Everything Happen to Me" (a.k.a. "Strange Things Happen", from Try Me!) | 35 | 5 | — | — | — | — | — | — | | non-album track/later included on I Got You (I Feel Good) |
| 1962 | "Shout and Shimmy" b/w "Come Over Here" | 61 | 16 | — | — | — | — | — | — | | Good, Good, Twistin' with James Brown |
| 1962 | "Mashed Potatoes U.S.A." b/w "You Don't Have to Go" (from The Amazing James Brown) | 82 | 21 | — | — | — | — | — | — | | James Brown and His Famous Flames Tour the U.S.A. |
| 1962 | "Three Hearts in a Tangle" b/w "I've Got Money" | 93 | 18 | — | — | — | — | — | — | | James Brown and His Famous Flames Tour the U.S.A. |
| 1963 | "Like a Baby" / | — | 24 | — | — | — | — | — | — | | James Brown and His Famous Flames Tour the U.S.A. |
| 1963 | "Every Beat of My Heart" | 99 | — | — | — | — | — | — | — | | James Brown and His Famous Flames Tour the U.S.A. |
| 1963 | "Prisoner of Love" b/w "Choo Choo" | 18 | 6 | — | — | — | — | — | — | | Prisoner of Love |
| 1963 | "These Foolish Things" b/w "(Can You) Feel It Part 1" (from Prisoner Of Love) | 55 | 25 | — | — | — | — | — | — | | non-album track (later re-recorded for Hell) |
| 1963 | "Signed Sealed and Delivered" b/w "Waiting in Vain" | 77 | — | — | — | — | — | — | — | | Prisoner of Love |
| 1963 | "I've Got to Change" b/w "The Bells" (from The Amazing James Brown) | — | — | — | — | — | — | — | — | | Try Me! |
| 1964 | "Oh Baby Don't You Weep"—Part 1 b/w Part 2 | 23 | — | — | — | — | — | — | — | | non-album track/Pure Dynamite! Live at the Royal |
| 1964 | "Please, Please, Please" (overdubbed) b/w "In the Wee Wee Hours (Of the Nite)" (from Tour the U.S.A.) | 95 | — | — | — | — | — | — | — | | Pure Dynamite! Live at the Royal |
| 1964 | "Again" b/w "How Long Darling" | — | — | — | — | — | — | — | — | | Prisoner of Love |
| 1964 | "So Long" b/w "Dancin' Little Thing" (from The Amazing James Brown) | — | — | — | — | — | — | — | — | | Prisoner of Love |
| 1964 | "Tell Me What You're Gonna Do" b/w "I Don't Care" (from Tour the U.S.A.) | — | — | — | — | — | — | — | — | | The Amazing James Brown |
| 1964 | "Think" b/w "Try Me" (from Prisoner of Love) | — | — | — | — | — | — | — | — | | James Brown Live at the Apollo |
| 1964 | "Have Mercy Baby" b/w "Just Won't Do Right" | 92 | — | — | — | — | — | — | — | | Good, Good, Twistin' with James Brown |
Smash releases:
| 1964 | "Caldonia" b/w "Evil" | 95 | — | — | — | — | — | — | — | | Showtime |
| 1964 | "The Things That I Used to Do" b/w "Out of the Blue" | 99 | — | — | — | — | — | — | — | | Showtime |
| 1964 | "Out of Sight" b/w "Maybe the Last Time" | 24 | — | — | 23 | — | — | — | — | | Out Of Sight |
| 1965 | "Devil's Hideaway" b/w "Who's Afraid of Virginia Woolf"; James Brown at the Organ | — | — | — | — | — | — | — | — | | Grits & Soul |
| 1965 | "Try Me" b/w "Papa's Got a Brand New Bag"; Instrumental versions: James Brown at the Organ | 63 | 34 | — | — | — | — | — | — | | James Brown Plays James Brown - Today & Yesterday |
| 1966 | "New Breed" (Part I) (The Boog-A-Loo) b/w Part II | 102 | — | — | 99 | — | — | — | — | | James Brown Plays New Breed |
| 1966 | "James Brown's Boo-Ga-Loo" b/w "Lost in a Mood of Changes" | — | — | — | — | — | — | — | — | | James Brown Plays New Breed |
| 1966 | "Let's Go Get Stoned" b/w "Our Day Will Come" | — | — | — | — | — | — | — | — | | Handful Of Soul |
| 1967 | "Jimmy Mack" b/w "What Do You Like"; James Brown at the Organ | — | — | — | — | — | — | — | — | | James Brown Plays the Real Thing |
King releases:
| 1965 | "This Old Heart" b/w "It Was You" (from Try Me!) | — | — | — | — | — | — | — | — | | Papa's Got A Brand New Bag |
| 1965 | "Papa's Got a Brand New Bag"—Part 1 b/w Part 2 | 8 | 1 | — | 6 | — | — | 16 | 25 | | non-album track/Papa's Got A Brand New Bag |
| 1965 | "I Got You (I Feel Good)" b/w "I Can't Help It (I Just Do-Do-Do)" | 3 | 1 | — | 35 | — | — | — | 29 | | non-album track/I Got You (I Feel Good) (original version on Out of Sight) |
| 1965 | "Lost Someone" (Live) / | 94 | — | — | — | — | — | — | — | | James Brown Live at the Apollo |
| 1965 | "I'll Go Crazy" (Live) | 73 | 28 | — | — | — | — | — | — | | James Brown Live at the Apollo |
| 1966 | "Ain't That a Groove"—Parts 1 & 2 | 42 | 6 | — | 46 | — | — | — | 51 (Note: Chart position is from the official UK "Breakers List".) | | It's a Man's Man's Man's World |
| 1966 | "Come Over Here" b/w "Tell Me What You're Gonna Do" (from Good, Good, Twistin' with James Brown) | — | — | — | — | — | — | — | — | | The Amazing James Brown |
| 1966 | "It's a Man's Man's Man's World" b/w "Is It Yes or Is It No?" | 8 | 1 | 14 | 25 | — | 33 | — | 13 | | non-album track/It's A Man's Man's Man's World |
| 1966 | "How Long Darling" b/w "This Old Heart" (from Think!) | — | — | — | — | — | — | — | — | | Prisoner of Love |
| 1966 | "Money Won't Change You"—Part 1 b/w Part 2 | 53 | 16 | — | 52 | — | — | — | — | | James Brown Sings Raw Soul |
| 1966 | "Don't Be a Drop-Out" b/w "Tell Me That You Love Me" | 50 | 4 | — | 35 | — | — | — | — | | James Brown Sings Raw Soul |
| 1966 | "The Christmas Song"—Version 1 b/w Version 2 | — | — | — | — | — | — | — | — | | James Brown Sings Christmas Songs |
| 1966 | "Sweet Little Baby Boy"—Part 1 b/w Part 2 | — | — | — | — | — | — | — | — | | James Brown Sings Christmas Songs |
| 1966 | "Let's Make This Christmas Mean Something This Year"—Part 1 b/w Part 2 | — | — | — | — | — | — | — | — | | James Brown Sings Christmas Songs |
| 1967 | "Bring It Up" b/w "Nobody Knows" | 29 | 7 | — | — | — | 47 | — | — | | James Brown Sings Raw Soul |
| 1967 | "Kansas City" b/w "Stone Fox" (from James Brown Sings Raw Soul) | 55 | 21 | — | — | — | — | — | — | | Live at the Apollo, Volume II |
| 1967 | "Think" (with Vicki Anderson); B-side by Vicki Anderson: "Nobody Cares" | 100 | — | — | — | — | — | — | — | | Live at the Apollo, Volume II |
| 1967 | "Let Yourself Go" b/w "Good Rockin' Tonight" (from Cold Sweat) | 46 | 5 | — | — | — | — | — | — | | James Brown Sings Raw Soul |
| 1967 | "I Loves You Porgy" b/w "Yours and Mine" (from James Brown Sings Raw Soul) | — | — | — | — | — | — | — | — | | Cold Sweat |
| 1967 | "It Won't Be Me" "Mona Lisa" (from Cold Sweat) | — | — | — | — | — | — | — | — | | Cold Sweat |
| 1967 | "Cold Sweat"—Part 1 b/w Part 2 | 7 | 1 | — | — | — | — | — | — | | Cold Sweat |
| 1967 | "Get It Together"—Part 1 b/w Part 2 | 40 | 11 | — | — | — | — | — | — | | I Can't Stand Myself When You Touch Me |
| 1967 | "The Soul of J.B." b/w "Funky Soul #1" | — | — | — | — | — | — | — | — | | I Can't Stand Myself When You Touch Me |
| 1967 | "I Can't Stand Myself (When You Touch Me)" / | 28 | 4 | — | — | — | — | — | — | | I Can't Stand Myself When You Touch Me |
| 1967 | "There Was a Time" | 36 | 3 | — | — | — | — | — | — | | I Can't Stand Myself When You Touch Me |
| 1968 | "You've Got to Change Your Mind" (with Bobby Byrd); B-side by Bobby Byrd: "I'll Lose My Mind" | — | 47 | — | — | — | — | — | — | | I Can't Stand Myself When You Touch Me |
| 1968 | "I Got the Feelin'" b/w "If I Ruled the World" | 6 | 1 | — | — | — | — | — | — | | I Got the Feelin' |
| 1968 | "Licking Stick – Licking Stick"—Part 1 b/w Part 2 | 14 | 2 | — | 31 | — | — | — | — | | Say It Loud – I'm Black and I'm Proud |
| 1968 | "America Is My Home"—Part 1 b/w Part 2 | 52 | 13 | — | — | — | — | — | — | | non-album tracks |
| 1968 | "I Guess I'll Have to Cry, Cry, Cry" b/w "Just Plain Funk" (from I Got the Feelin') | 55 | 15 | — | 52 | — | — | — | — | | Say It Loud – I'm Black and I'm Proud |
| 1968 | "Say It Loud – I'm Black and I'm Proud"—Part 1 b/w Part 2 | 10 | 1 | — | 47 | — | — | — | — | | Say It Loud – I'm Black and I'm Proud |
| 1968 | "Goodbye My Love" b/w "Shades of Brown" | 31 | 9 | — | 39 | — | — | — | — | | Say It Loud – I'm Black and I'm Proud |
| 1968 | "Tit for Tat (Ain't No Taking Back)" b/w "Believers Shall Enjoy (Non-Believers Shall Suffer)" | 86 | — | — | 58 | — | — | — | — | | A Soulful Christmas |
| 1969 | "Give It Up or Turnit a Loose" b/w "I'll Lose My Mind" (from Say It Loud – I'm Black and I'm Proud) | 15 | 1 | — | 45 | — | — | — | — | | non-album track released as an instrumental on Ain't It Funky |
| 1969 | "Soul Pride"—Part 1 b/w Part 2 | — | 33 | — | 100 | — | — | — | — | | The Popcorn |
| 1969 | "I Don't Want Nobody to Give Me Nothing (Open Up the Door, I'll Get It Myself)"—Part 1 b/w Part 2 | 20 | 3 | — | 51 | — | — | — | — | | non-album tracks |
| 1969 | "The Popcorn" b/w "The Chicken" | 30 | 11 | — | 46 | — | — | — | — | | The Popcorn |
| 1969 | "Mother Popcorn (You've Got to Have a Mother for Me)"—Part 1 b/w Part 2 | 11 | 1 | — | 16 | — | — | — | — | | It's a Mother |
| 1969 | "Lowdown Popcorn" b/w "Top of the Stack" (from It's A Mother) | 41 | 16 | — | 49 | — | — | — | — | | Sex Machine |
| 1969 | "World"—Part 1 b/w Part 2 | 37 | 8 | — | 52 | — | — | — | — | | It's a New Day – Let a Man Come In |
| 1969 | "Let a Man Come In and Do the Popcorn"—Part 1 b/w "Sometime" (from Super Bad) | 21 | 2 | — | 69 | — | — | — | — | | It's a New Day – Let a Man Come In |
| 1969 | "Let a Man Come In and Do the Popcorn"—Part 2 b/w "Gittin' a Little Hipper"—Part 2 (non-album track; instrumental version of "Get It Together") | 40 | 6 | — | 55 | — | — | — | — | | It's a New Day – Let a Man Come In |
| 1969 | "Ain't It Funky Now"—Part 1 b/w Part 2 | 24 | 3 | — | 64 | — | — | — | — | | Ain't It Funky |
| 1970 | "It's a New Day"—Parts 1 & 2 b/w "Georgia on My Mind" | 32 | 3 | — | 51 | 34 | 31 | 76 | — | | It's a New Day – Let a Man Come In |
| 1970 | "Funky Drummer"—Part 1 b/w Part 2 | 51 | 20 | — | 41 | — | — | — | — | | non-album tracks |
| 1970 | "Brother Rapp"—Parts 1 & 2 b/w "Bewildered" (new version; non-album track) | 32 | 2 | — | 62 | — | — | 79 | — | | Slaughter's Big Rip-Off |
| 1970 | "Get Up (I Feel Like Being A) Sex Machine"—Part 1 b/w Part 2 | 15 | 2 | 4 | — | 29 | — | 7 | 32 | | non-album track |
| 1970 | "Super Bad"—Parts 1 & 2 b/w Part 3 | 13 | 1 | — | — | 48 | 56 | — | — | | Super Bad |
| 1970 | "Santa Claus Is Definitely Here to Stay" b/w Instrumental Sing-Along version of A-side | - | — | — | — | — | — | — | — | | Hey America |
| 1970 | "Get Up, Get into It, Get Involved"—Part 1 b/w Part 2 | 34 | 4 | — | — | — | — | — | — | | non-album tracks |
| 1971 | "Spinning Wheel"—Part 1 (live) b/w Part 2 (live) | 90 | 79 | 89 | 50 | 78 | 10 | 53 | — | | Sex Machine |
| 1971 | "Soul Power"—Part 1 b/w Parts 2 & 3 | 29 | 3 | 92 | 67 | 47 | — | — | 78 (Note: Chart position from 1986.) | | non-album tracks |
| 1971 | "I Cried" b/w "World"(from It's A New Day - Let A Man Come In)—Part 2 | 50 | 15 | — | — | — | — | — | — | | non-album tracks |
"—" denotes items that did not chart or were not released in that territory. Note: All singles from (1956) "Please, Please, Please" through to (1968) "I Guess I'll Have to Cry, Cry, Cry" credited as James Brown and The Famous Flames

=== 1971–1981 ===
| Year | Titles (A-side, B-side) Both sides from same album except where indicated | Peak chart positions | | | | | | | | Certifications | Album |
| Year | Titles (A-side, B-side) Both sides from same album except where indicated | US | US R&B | BEL | CAN | GER | ITA | NED | UK | Certifications | Album |
|---|---|---|---|---|---|---|---|---|---|---|---|
Polydor releases:
| 1971 | "Escape-ism"—Part 1 b/w Parts 2 & 3 | 35 | 6 | — | — | — | — | — | — | | Hot Pants |
| 1971 | "Hot Pants"—Part 1 b/w Part 2 | 15 | 1 | 17 | 58 | 21 | — | 15 | 52 | | Hot Pants |
| 1971 | "Make It Funky"—Part 1 b/w Part 2 | 22 | 1 | — | 79 | — | — | — | — | | non-album tracks |
| 1971 | "My Part/Make It Funky"—Part 3 b/w Part 4 | 68 | — | — | — | — | — | — | — | | Get On The Good Foot |
| 1971 | "I'm a Greedy Man"—Part 1 b/w Part 2 | 35 | 7 | — | — | — | — | — | — | | There It Is |
| 1971 | "Hey America" b/w Instrumental Sing-Along version of A-side | — | — | — | — | — | 25 | — | 47 | | Hey America |
| 1972 | "Talkin' Loud and Sayin' Nothing" b/w Part 2 | 27 | 1 | — | — | — | — | — | — | | There It Is |
| 1972 | "King Heroin" b/w "Theme from King Heroin" (from Food for Thought) | 40 | 6 | — | — | — | — | — | — | | There It Is |
| 1972 | "There It Is"—Part 1 b/w Part 2 | 43 | 4 | — | — | — | — | 22 | — | | There It Is |
| 1972 | "Honky Tonk"—Part 1 b/w Part 2 | 44 | 7 | — | — | — | 49 | — | — | | non-album tracks |
| 1972 | "Get on the Good Foot"—Part 1 b/w Part 2 | 18 | 1 | — | — | — | — | — | — | US: Gold | Get on the Good Foot |
| 1972 | "I Got a Bag of My Own" b/w "Public Enemy #1"—Part 1 (from There It Is) | 44 | 3 | — | — | — | 37 | — | — | | Get on the Good Foot |
| 1972 | "What My Baby Needs Now Is a Little More Lovin'" b/w "This Guy-This Girl's In Love" (both tracks with Lyn Collins) | 56 | 17 | — | — | — | — | — | — | | non-album tracks |
| 1973 | "I Got Ants in My Pants"—Part 1 b/w Part 15 And 16 | 27 | 4 | — | — | — | — | — | 56 | | non-album tracks |
| 1973 | "Down and Out in New York City" b/2 "Mama's Dead" | 50 | 13 | — | — | — | — | — | — | | Black Caesar Soundtrack |
| 1973 | "Think" (new version) b/w "Something" | 77 | 15 | — | — | 49 | — | — | 56 | | non-album tracks |
| 1973 | "Think" (alternate version) b/w "Something" | 80 | 37 | — | — | — | — | — | — | | non-album tracks |
| 1973 | "Sexy, Sexy, Sexy" b/w "Slaughter Theme" | 50 | 6 | — | — | — | 29 | — | — | | Slaughter's Big Rip-Off |
| 1973 | "Stoned to the Bone"—Part 1 b/w "Stoned to the Bone (Some More)" | 58 | 4 | — | 100 | — | — | 97 | — | | The Payback |
| 1974 | "The Payback"—Part 1 b/w Part 2 | 26 | 1 | 54 | 69 | 93 | 12 | 35 | — | US: Gold | The Payback |
| 1974 | "Woman"—Part 1 b/w Part 2 | — | — | 18 | — | — | — | 8 | — | | Hot |
| 1974 | "My Thang" b/w "Public Enemy #1"—Part 1 (from There It Is) | 29 | 1 | — | — | — | — | — | — | | Hell |
| 1974 | "Papa Don't Take No Mess"—Part 1 b/w Part 2 | 31 | 1 | — | — | — | 50 | — | — | | Hell |
| 1974 | "Funky President (People It's Bad)" / | 44 | 4 | — | — | — | — | — | 59 | | Reality |
| 1974 | "Coldblooded" | 44 | — | — | — | — | — | — | — | | Hell |
| 1975 | "Reality" b/w "I Need Your Love So Bad" (from Messing with the Blues) | 80 | 19 | — | — | — | — | — | — | | Reality |
| 1975 | "Sex Machine"—Part 1 b/w Part 2 | 61 | — | — | — | — | — | — | — | | Sex Machine Today |
| 1975 | "Hustle!!! (Dead on It)" b/w "Dead on It"—Part 2 (from Sex Machine Today) | — | 11 | — | — | — | — | — | — | | Everybody's Doin' the Hustle & Dead on the Double Bump |
| 1975 | "Superbad, Superslick"—Part 1 b/w Part 2 | — | 28 | — | — | — | — | — | — | | Everybody's Doin' the Hustle & Dead on the Double Bump |
| 1975 | "Hot (I Need to Be Loved, Loved, Loved)" b/w "Superbad, Superslick"—Part 1 | — | 31 | — | — | — | — | — | — | | Hot |
| 1976 | "(I Love You) For Sentimental Reasons" b/w "Goodnight My Love" | — | 70 | — | — | — | — | — | — | | Hot |
| 1976 | "Get Up Offa That Thing" b/w "Release the Pressure" | 45 | 4 | — | — | — | — | — | 22 | | Get Up Offa That Thing |
| 1976 | "I Refuse to Lose" b/w "Home Again" | — | 47 | — | — | — | — | — | — | | Get Up Offa That Thing |
| 1976 | "Bodyheat"—Part 1 b/w Part 2 | 88 | 13 | — | — | — | — | — | 36 | | Bodyheat |
| 1977 | "Kiss in 77" b/w "Woman" | — | 35 | — | — | — | — | — | — | | Bodyheat |
| 1977 | "Give Me Some Skin" b/w "People Wake Up and Live"; Both sides with The J.B.'s | — | 20 | — | — | — | — | — | — | | Mutha's Nature |
| 1977 | "If You Don't Give a Doggone About It" b/w "People Who Criticize"; Both sides with The J.B.'s | — | 45 | — | — | — | — | — | — | | Mutha's Nature |
| 1977 | "Take Me Higher and Groove Me" b/w "Summertime" (by Martha & James) | — | — | — | — | — | 8 | — | — | | Mutha's Nature |
| 1978 | "Eyesight" b/w "I Never, Never, Never Will Forget" | — | 38 | — | — | — | — | — | — | | Jam 1980's |
| 1978 | "The Spank" b/w "Love Me Tender" (Non-album track) | — | 26 | — | — | — | — | — | — | | Jam 1980's |
| 1979 | "For Goodness Sakes, Look at Those Cakes"—Part 1 b/w Part 2 | — | 52 | — | — | 85 | — | — | — | | Take a Look at Those Cakes |
| 1979 | "It's Too Funky in Here" b/w "Are We Really Dancing" (from People) | — | 15 | — | 59 | — | 57 | — | — | | The Original Disco Man |
| 1979 | "Star Generation" b/w "Women Are Something Else" (from The Original Disco Man) | — | 63 | — | — | — | 34 | — | — | | The Original Disco Man |
| 1980 | "Regrets" b/w "Stone Cold Drag" | — | 63 | — | — | — | 86 | — | — | | People |
| 1980 | "Rapp Payback (Where Iz Moses)" b/w Part 2 | — | 46 | — | — | — | — | — | 39 | | Soul Syndrome |
| 1980 | "Stay with Me" b/w "Smokin' and Drinkin'" | — | 80 | — | — | — | 75 | — | — | | Soul Syndrome |
"—" denotes items that did not chart or were not released in that territory.

=== 1983–present ===
| Year | Titles (A-side, B-side) Both sides from same album except where indicated | Peak chart positions | | | | | | | | Certifications | Album |
| Year | Titles (A-side, B-side) Both sides from same album except where indicated | US | US R&B | BEL | CAN | GER | ITA | NED | UK | Certifications | Album |
|---|---|---|---|---|---|---|---|---|---|---|---|
Other releases including Scotti Brothers Records:
| 1983 | "Night Time Is the Right Time" / | — | 73 | — | — | — | 70 | — | — | | Bring It On! |
| 1983 | "Bring It On...Bring It On" | — | 73 | — | — | — | — | — | 45 | | Bring It On! |
| 1984 | "Unity"—Part 1 ("The Third Coming") b/w Part 2 ("Because It's Coming"); Both sides with Afrika Bambaataa) | — | 87 | — | — | 57 | — | — | 49 | | Unity |
| 1985 | "Froggy Mix" (Medley) -- Part 1 b/w Part 2 | — | 23 | — | — | — | 35 | — | 50 | | Froggy Mix |
| 1985 | "Living in America"; B-side by Vince DiCola: "Farewell" | 4 | 10 | 2 | 5 | 12 | 13 | 8 | 5 | CAN: Gold | Gravity |
| 1985 | "Sex Machine '85" b/w "Papa's Got a Brand New Bag" (from 16 Greatest Hits) | — | 76 | — | — | — | — | — | 47 | | Non-album track |
| 1986 | "Gravity" b/w "Gravity" (Dub Mix, non-album track) | 93 | 26 | 12 | 79 | 44 | 32 | 31 | 65 | | Gravity |
| 1986 | "Sex Machine '86" b/w "Woman" (from Hot) | — | 67 | 34 | — | 91 | — | — | 46 | | Non-album track |
| 1987 | "How Do You Stop" b/w "House of Rock" (Non-album track) | — | 10 | 27 | — | 28 | 74 | — | 90 | | Gravity |
| 1988 | "She's the One" b/w "Funky President (People It's Bad)" (from Reality) | — | 12 | — | — | — | — | — | 45 | | Motherlode |
| 1988 | "The Payback Mix"—Part 1 b/w "Give It Up or Turnit a Loose" | — | — | 38 | — | — | — | 31 | 12 | | Non-album tracks |
| 1988 | "I'm Real" b/w "Tribute" | — | 2 | 12 | — | 88 | — | 22 | 31 | | I'm Real |
| 1988 | "Static" b/w "Godfather Runnin' the Joint" | — | 5 | — | — | 58 | — | — | 83 | | I'm Real |
| 1989 | "Gimme Your Love" (with Aretha Franklin); B-side by Aretha Franklin: "Think" (1989) | — | 48 | — | 37 | — | — | — | 79 | | Through The Storm (Aretha Franklin album) |
| 1991 | "(So Tired of Standing Still We Got to) Move On" b/w "You Are My Everything" | — | 48 | 91 | — | 66 | — | — | 52 | | Love Over-Due |
| 1991 | "Sex Machine '91" / | — | — | — | — | — | — | — | 69 | | Non-album track |
| 1992 | "I Got You (I Feel Good)" | — | — | 49 | — | — | — | — | 72 | | 20 All-Time Greatest Hits! |
| 1993 | "Can't Get Any Harder" (Radio mix) b/w "Can't Get Any Harder" (C&C / Leaders Of The New School Mix) (Non-album track) | — | 76 | — | — | — | — | — | 59 | | Universal James |
| 1998 | "Funk on Ah Roll" | — | — | — | — | — | — | — | 40 | | I'm Back |
| 2007 | "Sex Machine" (remix) | — | — | — | — | 83 | — | — | — | | Dynamite X |
| 2024 | "We Got to Change" | — | — | — | — | — | — | — | — | | Non-album track |
"—" denotes items that did not chart or were not released in that territory.

=== Billboard Year-End performances ===
| Year | Song | Year-End Position |
|---|---|---|
| 1965 | "Papa's Got a Brand New Bag" | 33 |
| 1967 | "Cold Sweat" | 77 |
| 1968 | "I Got the Feelin'" | 58 |
| 1968 | "Say It Loud – I'm Black and I'm Proud" | 90 |
| 1969 | "Mother Popcorn" | 68 |
| 1972 | "Get on the Good Foot" | 99 |
| 1986 | "Living in America" | 65 |

== Home video and film releases ==
- Hard Hits (1994; VHS only)
- Live at The House of Blues (1999)
- James Brown: Soul Survivor (2004)
- Live in Montreux 1981 (2005)
- The Night James Brown Saved Boston (2008)
- I Got the Feelin': James Brown in the '60s (2008; 3-DVD set featuring The Night James Brown Saved Boston, Live at the Boston Garden 1968, and Live at the Apollo '68)
- Live at the Boston Garden: April 5, 1968 (2009)

== Other appearances ==
| Year | Song | Album |
|---|---|---|
| 2004 | "Lela" | Lela (Hakim) |
| 2005 | "They Don't Want Music (ft. James Brown)" | Monkey Business (The Black Eyed Peas) |
| 2011 | "Super Bad" (Part 1 & Part 2) (live February 10, 1973) | The Best of Soul Train Live |

== See also ==
- The J.B.'s
