= Sex Machine: The Very Best of James Brown =

Greatest hits album by James Brown
- Released: November 9, 1991
- Recorded: 1956–1988
- Genre: Funk; R&B; soul
- Label: Polydor
- Producer: James Brown; Ralph Bass; Brad Shapiro; Dan Hartman; Full Force

James Brown chronology
| Star Time (1991) | Sex Machine: The Very Best of James Brown (1991) | Roots of a Revolution (1995) |

Sex Machine: The Very Best of James Brown is a compilation album by American singer-songwriter James Brown, released in 1991 by Polydor Records in the United Kingdom and Europe as a single-disc alternative to the Star Time four-CD box set; the compilation 20 All-Time Greatest Hits! was released in North America instead.

It includes several songs not featured on the box set, some due to licensing differences.

== Track listing ==
| No. | Title | Writer(s) | Origin | Length |
|---|---|---|---|---|
| 1. | "Please, Please, Please" | James Brown; Johnny Terry | Please Please Please (1958) | 2:45 |
| 2. | "Think" | Lowman Pauling | Think! (1960) | 2:47 |
| 3. | "Night Train" | Oscar Washington; Lewis P. Simpkins; Jimmy Forrest | James Brown Presents His Band (1961) | 3:31 |
| 4. | "Out of Sight" | Ted Wright | Out of Sight (1964) | 2:24 |
| 5. | "Papa's Got a Brand New Bag, Pt. 1" | Brown | non-album single (1965) | 2:06 |
| 6. | "I Got You (I Feel Good)" | Brown | I Got You (I Feel Good) (1966) | 2:47 |
| 7. | "It's a Man's Man's Man's World" | Brown; Betty Jean Newsome | It's a Man's Man's Man's World (1966) | 2:47 |
| 8. | "Cold Sweat" | Brown; Alfred Ellis | Cold Sweat (1967) | 2:51 |
| 9. | "Say It Loud – I'm Black and I'm Proud, Pt. 1" | Brown; Ellis | A Soulful Christmas (1968) & Say It Loud – I'm Black and I'm Proud (1969) | 2:46 |
| 10. | "Get Up (I Feel Like Being a) Sex Machine" | Brown; Bobby Byrd; Ron Lenhoff | non-album single (1970) | 5:15 |
| 11. | "Hey America" | Nat Jones; A. William Jones | Hey America (1970) | 3:38 |
| 12. | "Make It Funky, Pt. 1" | Brown; Charles Bobbit | Get on the Good Foot (1972) | 3:15 |
| 13. | "I'm a Greedy Man, Pt. 1" | Brown; Bobbit | There It Is (1972) | 3:38 |
| 14. | "Get on the Good Foot" | Brown; Fred Wesley; Joseph Mims | Get on the Good Foot | 3:35 |
| 15. | "Get Up Offa That Thing" | Deidre Jenkins; Deanna Brown; Yamma Brown | Get Up Offa That Thing (1976) | 4:10 |
| 16. | "It's Too Funky in Here" | George Jackson; Walter Shaw; Brad Shapiro; Robert Miller | The Original Disco Man (1979) | 3:59 |
| 17. | "Living in America" | Dan Hartman; Charlie Midnight | Rocky IV soundtrack (1985) & Gravity (1986) | 4:43 |
| 18. | "I'm Real" | Brown; Full Force | I'm Real (1988) | 5:34 |
| 19. | "Hot Pants, Pt. 1" | Brown; Wesley | Hot Pants (1971) | 3:07 |
| 20. | "Soul Power" (live) | Brown | Love, Power, Peace: Live at the Olympia, Paris, 1971 (1992; recorded 1971) | 4:21 |

== Personnel ==
Adapted from the album's liner notes.

- James Brown – producer (tracks 4–15, 19–20)
- Ralph Bass – producer (track 1)
- [tracks 2 & 3 producer unknown]
- Brad Shapiro – producer (track 16)
- Dan Hartman – producer (track 17)
- Full Force – producer (track 18)
- David Redfern – cover photograph
- Colors – album design

== Charts ==
| Chart (1991) | Peak position |
|---|---|
| Australian Albums (ARIA) | 196 |
| UK Albums (OCC) | 19 |

== Certifications ==
| Region | Certification | Certified units/sales |
|---|---|---|
| United Kingdom (BPI) | Gold | 100,000^{^} |
^{^} Shipments figures based on certification alone.
