= The Godfather: The Very Best of James Brown =

Compilation album by James Brown
- Released: 2002
- Label: Universal
- Producer: James Brown; Ralph Bass; Full Force; Brad Shapiro; Dan Hartman

James Brown chronology
20th Century Masters – The Millennium Collection: The Best of James Brown, Vol. 2: The 70's (2002)	The Godfather: The Very Best of James Brown (2002)	The Next Step (2002)

The Godfather: The Very Best of James Brown is a compilation album by American singer-songwriter James Brown, released in 2002 by Universal Records.

== Critical reception ==
Professional ratings
Review scores
Source	Rating
AllMusic	4/5 stars

In a review for AllMusic, Thom Jurek opined that "for a single disc" compilation, The Godfather was "quite solid if bare in places" and that the album "contains all [of Brown's] major hits", though "there is plenty [of his other material] missing". Concluding the review, Jurek stated that "[t]here is no single compilation of James Brown's music that can really be considered complete, but this one [...] stands with the best of them despite lacking some cuts.

== Track listing ==
All tracks written by James Brown, except where noted.

No.	Title	Writer(s)	Origin	Length
1.	"Papa's Got a Brand New Bag"		non-album single (1965)	2:07
2.	"I Got You (I Feel Good)"		I Got You (I Feel Good) (1966)	2:48
3.	"It's a Man's Man's Man's World"	Brown; Betty Jean Newsome	It's a Man's Man's Man's World (1966)	2:47
4.	"Please, Please, Please"	Brown; Johnny Terry	Please Please Please (1958)	2:45
5.	"Think"	Lowman Pauling	Think! (1960)	2:47
6.	"Night Train"	Oscar Washington; Lewis P. Simpkins; Jimmy Forrest	James Brown Presents His Band (1961)	3:31
7.	"Cold Sweat"	Brown; Alfred "Pee Wee" Ellis	Cold Sweat (1967)	2:53
8.	"Give It Up or Turnit a Loose"	Charles Bobbit	Ain't It Funky (1970)	3:13
9.	"Funky Drummer" (Parts 1 & 2)		non-album single (1970)	7:00
10.	"Get Up (I Feel Like Being a) Sex Machine"	Brown; Bobby Byrd; Ron Lenhoff	non-album single (1970)	5:18
11.	"Soul Power"		non-album single (1971)	4:21
12.	"Get on the Good Foot"	Brown; Fred Wesley; Joseph Mims	Get on the Good Foot (1972)	3:37
13.	"Doing It to Death"		Doing It to Death (1973)	5:23
14.	"Get Up Offa That Thing"	Deanna Brown; Deidre Brown; Yamma Brown	Get Up Offa That Thing (1976)	4:11
15.	"I'm Real"	Paul Anthony George; Brian George; Lucien George Jr.; Gerry Charles; Hugh Junior Clark; Curt Bedeau	I'm Real (1988)	5:35
16.	"It's Too Funky in Here"	Brad Shapiro; George Jackson; Robert Miller; Walter Shaw	The Original Disco Man (1979)	3:59
17.	"Living in America"	Charlie Midnight; Dan Hartman	Rocky IV soundtrack (1985) & Gravity (1986)	4:43
18.	"Super Bad"		Super Bad (1971)	5:02
19.	"The Boss"		Black Caesar soundtrack (1973)	3:13
20.	"The Payback Mix"		non-album single (1988)	3:36

== Personnel ==
- James Brown – producer (tracks 1–3, 7–14, 18–20)
- Ralph Bass – producer (track 4)
- [tracks 5 & 6 producer unknown]
- Full Force – producer (track 15)
- Brad Shapiro – producer (track 16)
- Dan Hartman – producer (track 17)

== Charts ==
Chart performance for The Godfather: The Very Best of James Brown
Chart (2002)	Peak position
Swiss Albums (Schweizer Hitparade)	61
UK Albums (OCC)	30

== Certifications ==
Region	Certification	Certified units/sales
United Kingdom (BPI)	Gold	100,000^{^}
^{^} Shipments figures based on certification alone.
