= James Brown's Funky Christmas =

Compilation album by James Brown
- Released: October 17, 1995
- Genre: Christmas
- Length: 64:52
- Label: Polygram Records
- Producer: James Brown

James Brown chronology
Universal James (1992)	James Brown's Funky Christmas (1995)	I'm Back (1998)

Professional ratings
Review scores
Source	Rating
AllMusic	3/5 stars
Austin Chronicle	3/5 stars

James Brown's Funky Christmas is a compilation of the best songs from James Brown's three earlier Christmas albums, 1966's James Brown Sings Christmas Songs, 1968's A Soulful Christmas and 1970's Hey America It's Christmas. This album was also released under the title of 20th Century Masters: The Best of James Brown, The Christmas Collection.

== Critical reception ==
Richie Unterberger of AllMusic writes, "his 17-track compilation includes selections from seasonal albums cut by Brown in 1966, 1968, and 1970. Good Christmas rock and soul is somewhat of an oxymoron, but if you want some, you're better off with this than most anything else."

Andy Langer of The Austin Chronicle gives this album 3 stars and writes, "J.B.'s effortless melding of rhythm, tempo, and bridges galore does the unthinkable - it makes this a James Brown collection worth pulling off the shelf in July."

The Washington City Paper's Eddie Dean writes "Instead of harping on the usual Hallmark platitudes, Brown targets Christmas as payback time for an oppressed people; instead of tearful wishes, he’s got some demands to make."

Rolling Stone lists James Brown's Funky Christmas as No. 3 in its list of 10 best Christmas albums of all time.

Randy Anthony at Hip Christmas reviews James Brown's Christmas albums and says of "Funky Christmas" that James Brown "was no less brilliant during December than during the other eleven months of the year."

T. Ballard Lesemann of The Charleston City Paper writes, "Some songs really jump. The crisp syncopation and jazzy horn work on "Santa Claus Go Straight to the Ghetto" creates an effective groove over which JB can do his thing, and it's not just shoutin' and gruntin'. The tricky rhythms, trebly guitar chords, trumpet accents, and Brown's hollers and "Look'a here!" exclamations on "Soulful Christmas," "Christmas is Love," and "Tit for Tat (Ain't No Taking Back)" resemble his most fiery hits."

== Track listing ==
No.	Title	Writer(s)	Length
1.	"Go Power at Christmas Time"	Nat Jones	3:10
2.	"Let's Unite the Whole World at Christmas"	James Brown; Nat Jones	2:42
3.	"Santa Claus Go Straight to the Ghetto"	James Brown; Alfred Ellis; Hank Ballard	3:00
4.	"Merry Christmas Baby"	Lou Baxter; Johnny Moore	3:54
5.	"Let's Make Christmas Mean Something This Year"	James Brown; Nat Jones	6:28
6.	"Soulful Christmas"	James Brown; Alfred Ellis; Hank Ballard	3:05
7.	"The Christmas Song (Version 1)"	Robert Wells; Mel Tormé	2:40
8.	"Sweet Little Baby Boy"	James Brown; Nat Jones	5:14
9.	"Christmas Is Love"	Nat Jones	5:59
10.	"Please Come Home for Christmas"	Charles Brown; Gene Redd	3:20
11.	"Santa Claus Is Definitely Here to Stay"	Nat Jones	4:21
12.	"Tit for Tat (Ain't No Taking Back)"	James Brown; Nat Jones	3:03
13.	"Santa Claus, Santa Claus"	James Brown; Nat Jones	4:01
14.	"Merry Christmas, I Love You"	James Brown; Nat Jones	2:30
15.	"Signs of Christmas"	James Brown; Nat Jones	4:35
16.	"Christmas in Heaven"	Billy Ward	2:54
17.	"Hey America"	Nat Jones; Addie William Jones	3:56
Total length:			64:52

- Track information and credits taken from the album's liner notes.
