= The Complete James Brown Christmas =

Compilation album by James Brown
- Released: October 12, 2010
- Recorded: 1966, 1968, 1970
- Genre: Funk, Christmas
- Length: 2:14:53
- Label: Hip-O-Select
- Producer: James Brown

The Complete James Brown Christmas is a compilation album by James Brown. The double album CD set was released on October 12, 2010, on Hip-O-Select. It comprises all the tracks from James Brown Sings Christmas Songs (1966), A Soulful Christmas (1968), and Hey America (1970) and adds relevant singles and single edits.

== Track listing ==
Disc one
No.	Title	Length
1.	"Let's Make Christmas Mean Something This Year"	6:30
2.	"Sweet Little Baby Boy (Parts 1 & 2)"	5:15
3.	"Merry Christmas, I Love You"	2:30
4.	"Signs of Christmas"	4:38
5.	"The Christmas Song (Version 2)"	2:45
6.	"Merry Christmas Baby"	3:54
7.	"The Christmas Song (Version 1)"	2:40
8.	"Please Come Home For Christmas"	3:20
9.	"This Is My Lonely Christmas (Part 1)"	3:00
10.	"This Is My Lonely Christmas (Part 2)"	4:45
11.	"Christmas In Heaven"	2:54
12.	"Santa Claus Go Straight To The Ghetto"	3:02
13.	"Santa Claus, Santa Claus"	4:04
14.	"Believers Shall Enjoy (Non Believers Shall Suffer)"	2:16
15.	"Soulful Christmas"	3:08
16.	"Tit For Tat (Ain't No Taking Back)"	3:06
17.	"Christmas Is Coming"	2:39
18.	"Say It Loud – I'm Black and I'm Proud (Parts 1 & 2)"	4:48
19.	"In The Middle"	2:44
20.	"Let's Unite The Whole World At Christmas"	2:45
21.	"You Know It"	2:22
22.	"Santa Claus Gave Me A Brand New Start"	3:49

Disc two
No.	Title	Length
1.	"Hey America"	3:36
2.	"A Lonely Little Boy Around One Little Christmas Toy"	4:01
3.	"Go Power At Christmas Time"	3:11
4.	"Christmas Is Love"	6:01
5.	"Santa Claus Is Definitely Here To Stay"	4:22
6.	"My Rapp"	6:01
7.	"I'm Your Christmas Friend, Don't Be Hungry"	3:10
8.	"Merry Christmas My Baby And A Very, Very, Happy New Year"	3:54
9.	"It's Christmas Time (Part 1)" (Non-LP Single)	3:11
10.	"It's Christmas Time (Part 2)" (Non-LP Single)	3:14
11.	"You Know It" (Single Version)	2:51
12.	"Believers Shall Enjoy (Non Believers Shall Suffer)" (Single Version)	2:39
13.	"Hey America" (Sing Along Version - previously unreleased stereo version)	3:44
14.	"Santa Claus Is Definitely Here To Stay" (Single Version)	4:21
15.	"Santa Claus Is Definitely Here To Stay" (Sing Along Version - previously unreleased stereo version)	4:24
