= The Singles, Volume IV: 1966–1967 =

Compilation album by James Brown
- Released: October 19, 2007
- Recorded: December 13, 1965 – September 5, 1967
- Genre: R&B
- Length: 1:58:36
- Label: Hip-O Select
- Producer: Various

James Brown chronology
The Singles, Volume III: 1964–1965 (2007)	The Singles, Volume IV: 1966–1967 (2007)	The Singles, Volume V: 1967–1969 (2008)

Professional ratings
Review scores
Source	Rating
AllMusic	4.5/5 stars

The Singles, Volume IV: 1966–1967 is the fourth compilation in a series of releases by Hip-O Select Records compiling the singles of James Brown. This compilation features all 7" single releases, including re-issues and canceled singles.

== Track listing ==
Disc 1

1. "Ain't That a Groove, Pt. 1" (Brown, Nat Jones) – 2:37 – James Brown & the Famous Flames
2. "Ain't That a Groove, Pt. 2" (Brown, Nat Jones) – 1:47 – James Brown & the Famous Flames
3. "New Breed (The Boo-Ga-Loo), Pt. 1" (Brown, Nat Jones) – 2:39 – James Brown
4. "New Breed (The Boo-Ga-Loo), Pt. 2" (Brown, Nat Jones) – 2:23 – James Brown
5. "It's a Man's Man's Man's World" (Brown, Betty Newsome) – 2:48 – James Brown & the Famous Flames
6. "Is It Yes or Is It No?" (Brown) – 2:58 – James Brown & the Famous Flames
7. "James Brown's Boo-Ga-Loo" (Brown, Nat Jones) – 2:17 – James Brown
8. "Lost in a Mood of Changes" (Brown, Nat Jones) – 1:56 – James Brown
9. "Money Won't Change You, Pt. 1" (Brown, Nat Jones) – 2:46 – James Brown & the Famous Flames
10. "Money Won't Change You, Pt. 2" (Brown, Nat Jones) – 2:22 – James Brown & the Famous Flames
11. "This Old Heart" (Brown) – 2:35 – James Brown & the Famous Flames
12. "Don't Be a Drop-Out" (Burt Jones) – 3:45 – James Brown & the Famous Flames
13. "Tell Me That You Love Me" (Brown, Bud Hobgood, Nat Jones) – 1:42 – James Brown & the Famous Flames
14. "Let's Go Get Stoned" (Jo Armstead, Nickolas Ashford, Valerie Simpson) – 2:44
15. "Our Day Will Come" (Mort Garson, Bob Hilliard) – 2:44 – James Brown at the Organ
16. "This Christmas Song [Part 1]" (Mel Tormé, Robert Wells) – 2:43 – James Brown at the Organ
17. "This Christmas Song [Part 2]" (Mel Tormé, Robert Wells) – 2:47 – James Brown & the Famous Flames
18. "Sweet Little Baby Boy, Pt. 1" (Brown, Nat Jones) – 2:54 – James Brown & the Famous Flames
19. "Sweet Little Baby Boy, Pt. 2" (Brown, Nat Jones) – 2:37 – James Brown & the Famous Flames
20. "Let's Make Christmas Something This Year, Pt. 1" (Brown, Nat Jones) – 2:53 – James Brown & the Famous Flames
21. "Let's Make Christmas Something This Year, Pt. 2" (Brown, Nat Jones) – 2:57 – James Brown & the Famous Flames

Disc 2

1. "Bring It Up" (Brown, Nat Jones) – 2:54 – James Brown & the Famous Flames
2. "Nobody Knows" (Brown, James Crawford) – 3:24 – James Brown & the Famous Flames
3. "Kansas City" (Jerry Leiber, Mike Stoller) – 3:01 – James Brown & the Famous Flames
4. "Stone Fox" (Brown, Bud Hobgood) – 2:46 – James Brown & the Famous Flames
5. "It's a Gas, Pt. 1" (Brown, Bud Hobgood) – 2:37 – The James Brown Dancers
6. "It's a Gas, Pt. 2" (Brown, Bud Hobgood) – 1:56 – The James Brown Dancers
7. "Think" (Lowman Pauling) – 3:22 – Vicki Anderson and James Brown
8. "Let Yourself Go" (Brown) 3:00 – James Brown & the Famous Flames
9. "Good Rockin' Tonight" (Roy Brown) – 2:27 – James Brown & the Famous Flames
10. "I Loves You Porgy" (George Gershwin, Ira Gershwin, Dorothy Heyward) – 2:35 – James Brown & the Famous Flames
11. "Yours and Mine" (Brown, Bud Hobgood) – 2:46 – James Brown & the Famous Flames
12. "Jimmy Mack" (Holland-Dozier-Holland) – 3:01 – James Brown at the Organ
13. "What Do You Like" (Alfred "Pee Wee" Ellis) – 2:49 – James Brown at the Organ
14. "It Won't Be Me" (Brown, Alfred "Pee Wee" Ellis) – 3:37 – James Brown & the Famous Flames
15. "Mona Lisa" (Ray Evans, Jay Livingston) – 1:57 – James Brown & the Famous Flames
16. "Cold Sweat, Pt. 1" (Brown, Alfred "Pee Wee" Ellis) – 2:53 – James Brown & the Famous Flames
17. "Cold Sweat, Pt. 2" (Brown, Alfred "Pee Wee" Ellis) – 3:15 – James Brown & the Famous Flames
18. "Get It Together, Pt. 1" (Brown, Alfred "Pee Wee" Ellis, Hobgood) – 3:50 – James Brown & the Famous Flames
19. "Get It Together, Pt. 2" (Brown, Alfred "Pee Wee" Ellis, Hobgood) – 3:54 – James Brown & the Famous Flames
20. "Get It Together, Pt. 1" [Version 1] (Brown, Alfred "Pee Wee" Ellis, Bud Hobgood) – 3:44 – James Brown & the Famous Flames
21. "Get It Together, Pt. 2" [Version 2] (Brown, Alfred "Pee Wee" Ellis, Bud Hobgood) – 3:54 – James Brown & the Famous Flames
