= Bring It On =

Bring It On may refer to:

== Books ==
- Bring It On (book), by Pat Robertson
- Bring It On! (manhwa), a romance manhwa by Baek Hye-Kyung

== Film and stage ==
- Bring It On (film series), an American series of teen comedy cheerleading films capitalizing on the success of the initial film
  - Bring It On (film) (2000), directed by Peyton Reed
  - Bring It On Again (2004) directed by Damon Santostefano
  - Bring It On: All or Nothing (2006) directed by Steve Rash
  - Bring It On: In It to Win It (2007) directed by Steve Rash
  - Bring It On: Fight to the Finish (2009) directed by Bille Woodruff
  - Bring It On: Worldwide Cheersmack (2017) directed by Robert Adetuyi
  - Bring It On: Cheer or Die (2022) directed by Karen Lam
  - "Bring It On", an episode of the Canadian TV series 6teen
  - Bring It On: The Musical, a musical with music by Tom Kitt and Lin-Manuel Miranda

== Music ==
=== Songs ===
- "Bring It On...Bring It On", a 1983 song by James Brown
- "Bring It On" (Alistair Griffin song), a 2004 single by Alistair Griffin
- "Bring It On" (Godsmack song), from the 2006 album Madden NFL 06:Soundtrack
- "Bring It On" (Lenny Kravitz song), from the 2007 album It Is Time for a Love Revolution
- "Bring It On" (Hard-Fi song), from the 2011 album Killer Sounds
- "Bring It On" (YoungBoy Never Broke Again song), from the 2022 mixtape Colors
- "Bring It On", by Mind Funk from the 1991 album Mind Funk
- "Bring It On", by the Geto Boys from the 1993 album Till Death Do Us Part
- "Bring It On", by Seal from the 1994 album Seal
- "Bring It On", by Jay-Z from the 1996 album Reasonable Doubt
- "Bring It On", by Lynyrd Skynyrd from the 1997 album Twenty
- "Bring It On", by the Jungle Brothers from the 1997 album Raw Deluxe
- "Bring It On", by N'Dea Davenport from the 1998 album N'Dea Davenport
- "Bring It On", by Gomez from the 1999 album Liquid Skin
- "Bring It On", by Billie Piper from the 2000 album Walk of Life
- "Bring It On", by Gossip from the 2001 album That's Not What I Heard
- "Bring It On", by Nick Cave and the Bad Seeds from the 2003 album Nocturama
- "Bring It On", by Goose from the 2006 album Bring It On
- "Bring It On", by Daddy Yankee from the 2007 album El Cartel: The Big Boss
- "Bring It On", by The Chipmunks from the 2009 album Alvin and the Chipmunks: The Squeakquel: Original Motion Picture Soundtrack
- "Bring It On", by Oneus from the 2022 album Trickster
- "Bring It On", by Dallas Smith from the 2023 album Dallas Smith
- "Bring It On!", by Tones & I, BIA and Diarra Sylla which was the official walk-out track of the 2023 2023 FIFA Women's World Cup

=== Albums ===
- Bring It On (Gomez album), 1998
- Bring It On (Keith Harling album), 1999
- Bring It On (Alistair Griffin album), 2004
- Bring It On (Kevin Fowler album), 2007
- Bring It On! (Machine Gun Fellatio album), 2000
- Bring It On! (HorrorPops album), 2005
- Bring It On (Kaci Battaglia album), 2010
- Bring It On! (James Brown album), 1983
- Bring It On, a 1997 album by Leadfoot
- Bring It On, a 2006 album by Goose
- Bring It On, a 2006 album by Jon Eberson
- Bring It On: The Best of Jay-Z, a 2003 compilation album

== See also ==
- Bring It (disambiguation)
