= Nonstop! =

Studio album by James Brown
- Released: April 1981
- Recorded: May – June 1979 ("World Cycle Inc."); September 1980 (remainder of titles)
- Studio: Mastersound (Augusta, Georgia)
- Genre: Funk
- Length: 38:46
- Label: Polydor; 6318
- Producer: James Brown

James Brown chronology
Soul Syndrome (1980)	Nonstop! (1981)	Bring It On! (1983)

Singles from Nonstop!
- 1. "Give That Bass Player Some" Released: 1981; 2. "I Go Crazy / World Cycle Inc." Released: 1981

Nonstop! is a studio album by American musician James Brown. The album was released in April 1981 and was compiled of outtakes from his previous album, T.K. Records' Soul Syndrome; the album thereby fulfilled his contract.

== Critical reception ==
Professional ratings
Review scores
Source	Rating
AllMusic	3/5 stars
Robert Christgau	B+
The Encyclopedia of Popular Music	3/5 stars
(The New) Rolling Stone Album Guide	3/5 stars

Robert Christgau noted that "the horn charts and rhythm arrangements are as tricky and on the one as in any newfangled funk you want to name."

== Track listing ==
All tracks are written by James Brown; except where indicated.

No.	Title	Writer(s)	Length
1.	"Popcorn 80's"		3:43
2.	"Give That Bass Player Some"	Susaye Brown	6:29
3.	"You're My Only Love"	James Brown, St. Clair Pinckney	4:58
4.	"World Cycle Inc."	L. Rhodes	3:03
5.	"Super Bull / Super Bad"		6:58
6.	"Love 80's"	James Brown, Susaye Brown	9:58
7.	"I Go Crazy"		3:35

== Personnel ==
- James Brown – lead vocals
- Martha High, Anne McLeod, Cathy Jordan, various band members – backing vocals
- Hollie Farris, Jerone "Jasaan" Sanford – trumpet
- Joe Poff – alto saxophone
- St. Clair Pinckney – tenor saxophone
- Jimmy Nolen, Ron Laster – electric guitar
- David Weston, Fred Thomas – bass guitar
- Johnny Griggs – congas, percussion
- Arthur Dickson – drums

The musicians on "World Cycle Inc." are unknown.
