= 20 All-Time Greatest Hits! =

Greatest hits album by James Brown
- Released: October 22, 1991
- Recorded: February 4, 1956 – April 1976
- Genre: Funk; R&B; soul
- Length: 70:26
- Label: Polydor
- Producer: Various

James Brown chronology
Star Time (1991)	20 All-Time Greatest Hits! (1991)	Roots of a Revolution (1995)

Professional ratings
Review scores
Source	Rating
AllMusic	5/5 stars
Rolling Stone	5/5 stars

20 All-Time Greatest Hits! is a compilation album by James Brown containing 20 of his most famous recordings. Released by Polydor in 1991 as a single-disc alternative to the Star Time four-CD box set, it features 20 songs recorded between 1956 and 1976. Sixteen of the songs from the album had previously topped the US R&B charts. The album itself peaked at number 99 on the R&B/Hip-Hop Albums chart after its release. Europe and the UK received an alternate release to promote Star Time, Sex Machine: The Very Best of James Brown.

In 2003, it was ranked #414 on Rolling Stone magazine's list of the 500 greatest albums of all time.

== Track listing ==
No.	Title	Writer(s)	Length
1.	"I Got You (I Feel Good)"	James Brown	2:47
2.	"Get Up (I Feel Like Being a) Sex Machine"	James Brown, Bobby Byrd, Ron Lenhoff	5:15
3.	"I Got the Feelin'"	Brown	2:38
4.	"Mother Popcorn, Pt. 1"	Brown, Pee Wee Ellis	3:16
5.	"Give It Up or Turnit a Loose"	Charles Bobbit	3:11
6.	"Make It Funky, Pt. 1"	Brown, Bobbit	3:15
7.	"Papa's Got a Brand New Bag, Pt. 1"	Brown	2:06
8.	"Think"	Lowman Pauling	2:45
9.	"It's a Man's Man's Man's World"	Brown, Betty Jean Newsome	2:47
10.	"Try Me"	Brown	2:30
11.	"Night Train"	Jimmy Forrest, Lewis Simpkins, Oscar Washington	3:31
12.	"Cold Sweat, Pt. 1"	Brown, Ellis, David Lindup	2:51
13.	"Get on the Good Foot"	Brown, Joe Mims, Fred Wesley	3:35
14.	"Papa Don't Take No Mess, Pt. 1"	Brown, Bobbit, Jabo Starks, Wesley	4:23
15.	"The Payback"	Brown, Starks, Wesley	7:38
16.	"Say It Loud - I'm Black and I'm Proud, Pt. 1"	Brown, Ellis	2:46
17.	"Super Bad, Pts. 1 & 2"	Brown	5:00
18.	"Hot Pants, Pt. 1"	Brown, Wesley	3:07
19.	"Get Up Offa That Thing"	Brown, Deidre Brown	4:10
20.	"Please, Please, Please"	Brown, Johnny Terry	2:44

== Personnel ==
Credits for 20 All-Time Greatest Hits! adapted from Allmusic.

- John Bobbit – composer
- Deanna Brown – composer
- Deidra Brown – composer
- James Brown – composer, vocals
- James Razor Brown – producer
- Yamma Brown – composer
- Alfred Ellis – composer
- Pee Wee Ellis – composer
- D. Jenkins – composer
- David Lindup – composer
- Mims, Joe – composer
- Lowman Pauling – composer
- Fred Wesley – composer
- Isabelle Wong – design

== Charts ==
Chart (1993)	Peak position
US R&B/Hip-Hop Albums (Billboard)	99

== Certifications ==
Region	Certification	Certified units/sales
United States (RIAA)	Platinum	1,000,000^{^}
^{^} Shipments figures based on certification alone.
