= Joe Sherman =

Joe Sherman may refer to:

- Joe Sherman (baseball) (1890–1987), Major League Baseball pitcher
- Joe Sherman (musician), American educator and musician
- Joe Sherman (songwriter) (1926–2017), American songwriter
- Joseph Sherman (1945–2006), Jewish Canadian poet and visual arts editor
