= The Singles, Volume I: The Federal Years: 1956–1960 =

Compilation album by James Brown
- Released: September 1, 2006
- Recorded: February 4, 1956 – February 20, 1960
- Studio: King Studios (Cincinnati, Ohio); Beltone Studios (New York City, New York); Master Recorders (Los Angeles, California); United Studios (Los Angeles, California)
- Genre: R&B, soul
- Length: 1:45:16
- Label: Hip-O Select
- Producer: Various

James Brown chronology
The Singles, Volume I: The Federal Years: 1956–1960 (2006)	The Singles, Volume II: 1960–1963 (2007)

Professional ratings
Review scores
Source	Rating
AllMusic	4/5 stars

The Singles, Volume I: The Federal Years: 1956–1960 (also known as The Federal Years: 1956–1960) is the first compilation in a series of releases by Hip-O Select Records compiling the singles of James Brown. This compilation features all 7" single releases, including re-issues and canceled singles. Most of the songs in this collection feature backing vocals by Brown's vocal group, The Famous Flames. It was the final release under James Brown's discography prior to his death on December 25, 2006.

== Track listing ==
All tracks are written by James Brown; except where indicated.

Disc 1
No.	Title	Writer(s)	Length
1.	"Please, Please, Please"	James Brown, Johnny Terry	2:43
2.	"Why Do You Do Me"	Bobby Byrd, Sylvester Keels	3:00
3.	"I Don't Know"	James Brown, Johnny Terry	2:49
4.	"I Feel That Old Feeling Coming On"	Nashpendle Knox, Nafloyd Scott	2:32
5.	"No, No, No, No"		2:12
6.	"Hold My Baby’s Hand"	James Brown, Wilbert Smith, Nafloyd Scott, Bobby Byrd	2:13
7.	"I Won’t Plead No More"	Bobby Byrd, Sylvester Keels	2:25
8.	"Chonnie-On-Chon"	James Brown, Nafloyd Scott, Bobby Byrd, Wilbert Smith	2:12
9.	"Just Won’t Do Right"		2:34
10.	"Let’s Make It"		2:25
11.	"Gonna Try"		2:44
12.	"Can’t Be The Same"		2:20
13.	"Messing With The Blues"	Floyd Hunt	2:09
14.	"Love Or A Game"		2:17
15.	"You’re Mine, You’re Mine"	James Brown, Nafloyd Scott	2:31
16.	"I Walked Alone"	Nashpendle Knox, Nafloyd Scott	2:39
17.	"That Dood It"	Rudy Toombs, Rose Marie McCoy	2:29
18.	"Baby Cries Over The Ocean"		2:22
19.	"Begging, Begging"	Julius Dixson, Rudy Toombs	2:52
20.	"That’s When I Lost My Heart"		2:49
21.	"Try Me [Demo Version]" (Bonus Track)		2:29

All tracks are written by James Brown; except where indicated.

Disc 2
No.	Title	Writer(s)	Length
1.	"Try Me"		2:31
2.	"Tell Me What I Did Wrong"		2:22
3.	"I Want You So Bad"		2:45
4.	"There Must Be a Reason"		2:26
5.	"I've Got to Change" (Mono)		2:25
6.	"It Hurts to Tell You" (Mono)	James Brown, Albert Shubert	2:52
7.	"I've Got to Change" (Stereo)		2:25
8.	"It Hurts to Tell You" (Stereo)	James Brown, Albert Shubert	2:51
9.	"Doodle Bee" (Instrumental released under James Davis)	J.C. Davis, Albert Shubert	2:38
10.	"Bucket Head" (Instrumental released under James Davis)	J.C. Davis, Albert Shubert	2:47
11.	"It Was You"		2:42
12.	"Got to Cry"		2:35
13.	"Good Good Lovin'"	Floyd Hunt	2:14
14.	"Don't Let It Happen to Me"		2:50
15.	"I'll Go Crazy"		2:06
16.	"I Know It’s True"		2:40
17.	"Think"	Lowman Pauling	2:47
18.	"You've Got the Power" (James Brown and Bea Ford)	James Brown, Johnny Terry	2:20
19.	"This Old Heart"		2:09
20.	"Wonder When You're Coming Home"		2:32
