= The Singles, Volume II: 1960–1963 =

Compilation album by James Brown
- Released: March 27, 2007
- Recorded: April 10, 1957 – October 4, 1963
- Genre: R&B
- Length: 1:48:45
- Label: Hip-O Select
- Producer: Various

James Brown chronology
The Singles, Volume I: The Federal Years: 1956–1960 (2006)	The Singles, Volume II: 1960–1963 (2007)	The Singles, Volume III: 1964–1965 (2007)

Singles from The Singles, Volume II: 1960–1963
- 1. "These Foolish Things" Released: June 16, 1963

The Singles, Volume II: 1960–1963 is the second compilation in a series of releases by Hip-O Select Records compiling the singles of James Brown. This compilation features all 7" single releases, including re-issues and cancelled singles. Many of the songs in this collection feature backing vocals by his singing group, The Famous Flames. It was the first release by James Brown after his death on December 25, 2006.

== Track listing ==
Disc 1

1. "The Bells" (Billy Ward) – 2:59 – James Brown
2. "And I Do Just What I Want" (James Brown) – 2:26 – James Brown
3. "Hold It" (Clifford Scott, Billy Butler) – 2:12 – James Brown Presents His Band
4. "The Scratch" (James Alston) – 1:47 – James Brown Presents His Band
5. "Bewildered" (Leonard Whitcup, Teddy Powell) – 2:27 – James Brown & the Famous Flames
6. "If You Want Me" (James Brown) – 2:26 – James Brown & the Famous Flames
7. "Suds" (Nathaniel Kendrick) – 2:22 – James Brown Presents His Band
8. "Sticky" (James Brown, J.C. Davis) – 2:46 – James Brown Presents His Band
9. "I Don't Mind" (James Brown) – 2:47 – James Brown & the Famous Flames
10. "Love Don't Love Nobody" (Roy Brown) – 2:08 – James Brown & the Famous Flames
11. "Cross Firing" (James Brown) – 2:25 – James Brown Presents His Band
12. "Night Flying" (James Brown) – 2:18 – James Brown Presents His Band
13. "Baby, You're Right" (Joe Tex, James Brown) – 3:05 – James Brown & the Famous Flames
14. "I'll Never, Never Let You Go" (James Brown) – 2:22 – James Brown & the Famous Flames
15. "I Love You, Yes I Do" (Guy Wood, Edward Seiler, Sol Marcus, Sally Nix, Henry Glover) – 2:49 – James Brown & the Famous Flames
16. "Just You and Me, Darling" (James Brown) – 2:49 – James Brown & the Famous Flames
17. "Lost Someone" (James Brown, Eugene Stallworth, Bobby Byrd) – 3:08 – James Brown & the Famous Flames
18. "Night Train" (Oscar Washington, Lewis Simpkins, Jimmy Forrest) – 3:33 – James Brown & the Famous Flames
19. "Why Does Everything Happen to Me" (James Brown) – 2:11 – James Brown & the Famous Flames
20. "Bewildered" (Demo) (Leonard Whitcup, Teddy Powell) – 2:54 – James Brown & the Famous Flames

Disc 2

1. "Shout and Shimmy" (James Brown) – 2:52 – James Brown & the Famous Flames
2. "Come Over Here" (James Brown) – 2:46 – James Brown & the Famous Flames
3. "Mashed Potatoes U.S.A." (James Brown) – 2:54 – James Brown & the Famous Flames
4. "You Don't Have To Go" (James Brown) – 2:50 – James Brown & the Famous Flames
5. "(Can You) Feel It-Part 1" (James Brown) – 2:59 – James Brown Presents His Band
6. "(Can You) Feel It-Part 2" (James Brown) – 2:38 – James Brown Presents His Band
7. "Three Hearts in a Tangle" (R.S. Pennington, Sonny Thompson) – 2:55 – James Brown & the Famous Flames
8. "I've Got Money" (James Brown) – 2:32 – James Brown & the Famous Flames
9. "Like a Baby" (Jesse Stone) – 2:54 – James Brown & the Famous Flames
10. "Every Beat of My Heart" (Johnny Otis) – 3:46 – James Brown & the Famous Flames
11. "Prisoner of Love" (Leo Robin, Clarence Gaskill, Russ Columbo) – 2:29 – James Brown & the Famous Flames
12. "Choo-Choo" (James Brown) – 2:55 – James Brown & the Famous Flames
13. "These Foolish Things" (Holt Marvell, Jack Strachey, Harry Link) – 2:56 – James Brown & the Famous Flames
14. "(Can You) Feel It-Part 1" (James Brown) – 2:59 – James Brown Presents His Band
15. "Devil's Den-Part 1" (James Brown) – 2:40 – The Poets
16. "Devil's Den-Part 2" (James Brown) – 2:34 – The Poets
17. "Signed, Sealed, and Delivered" (Cowboy Copas, Syd Nathan) – 2:51 – James Brown & the Famous Flames
18. "Waiting in Vain" (Ivory Joe Hunter) – 2:48 – James Brown & the Famous Flames
19. "Oh Baby Don't You Weep-Part 1" (James Brown) – 2:58 – James Brown & the Famous Flames
20. "Oh Baby Don't You Weep-Part 2" (James Brown) – 3:03 – James Brown & the Famous Flames
