= Soul Syndrome =

Studio album by James Brown
- Released: November 1980
- Recorded: September – October 1980
- Studios: Mastersound (Augusta, Georgia)
- Genre: Funk
- Length: 40:16
- Labels: TK; 615
- Producer: James Brown

James Brown chronology
People (1980)	Soul Syndrome (1980)	Nonstop! (1981)

Singles from Soul Syndrome
- 1. "Rapp Payback (Where Iz Moses)" Released: October 1980; 2. "Stay with Me / Smokin' & Drinkin'" Released: March 1981

Professional ratings
Review scores
Source	Rating
AllMusic	2.5/5 stars
Robert Christgau	A−
(The New) Rolling Stone Album Guide	4/5 stars
The Virgin Encyclopedia of R&B and Soul	4/5 stars

Soul Syndrome is a studio album by American musician James Brown, released in 1980 by TK Records. It was reissued in 1991 by Rhino Records.

== Track listings ==
Original release

Side A

No.	Title	Writer(s)	Length
1.	"Rapp Payback (Where Iz Moses)"	James Brown, Susaye Brown, Henry Stallings	13:58
2.	"Mashed Potatoes"	James Brown	5:18
Total length:			19:16

Side B

No.	Title	Writer(s)	Length
1.	"Funky Men"	James Brown	7:27
2.	"Smokin' & Drinkin'"	Anne McLeod, David Weston	4:33
3.	"Stay with Me"	Bobby Byrd, Susaye Brown	4:09
4.	"Honky Tonk"	Bill Doggett, Billy Butler, Clifford Scott, Henry Glover, Shep Shepherd	4:51
Total length:			21:00

1991 UK T.K. Records reissue CD bonus tracks

No.	Title	Writer(s)	Length
7.	"Bessie (Part 1)"	Sweet Charles Sherrell, Johnny Griggs, Melvin Parker, St. Clair Pinckney
8.	"Nature (Part 1)"	Deidre Brown, Joe Brown
9.	"Rock Groove Machine (Part 1)"	James Brown
10.	"Just Wanna Make You Dance (Part 1)"	James Brown, Larry Tinsley
11.	"Back from the Dead"	Clarence Reid, Willie Clarke
12.	"The Way to Get Down"	Clarence Reid, Willie Clarke
13.	"Headquarters (Augustus, GA)"	Clarence Reid, Willie Clarke
14.	"Rapp Payback (Where Iz Moses?)" (7", Part 1)	Henry Stallings, James Brown, Susaye Brown

1991 US Rhino Records reissue CD bonus tracks

No.	Title	Length
7.	"Rapp Payback (Where Iz Moses?)" (12" Single Version)
8.	"Rapp Payback (Where Iz Moses?)" (Part II - 12" Single Version)

== Personnel ==
- James Brown – lead vocals
- Martha High, Anne McLeod, Cathy Jordan, various band members – backing vocals
- Hollie Farris, Jerone "Jasaan" Sanford – trumpet
- Joe Poff – alto saxophone
- St. Clair Pinckney – tenor saxophone
- Jerry Poindexter – electric piano
- Jimmy Nolen, Ron Laster – electric guitar
- David Weston – bass guitar
- Moses Turner – drum sticks played on a phone book
- Johnny Griggs – congas, percussion
- Arthur Dickson – drums
