= The Singles, Volume III: 1964–1965 =

Compilation album by James Brown
- Released: June 8, 2007
- Recorded: February 4, 1956 – August 1965
- Genre: R&B
- Length: 1:32:15
- Label: Hip-O Select
- Producer: Various

James Brown chronology
The Singles, Volume II: 1960–1963 (2007)	The Singles, Volume III: 1964–1965 (2007)	The Singles, Volume IV: 1966–1967 (2007)

Professional ratings
Review scores
Source	Rating
AllMusic	3.5/5 stars

The Singles, Volume III: 1964–1965 is the third compilation in a series of releases by Hip-O Select Records compiling the singles of James Brown. This compilation features all 7" single releases, including re-issues and canceled singles.

== Track listing ==
Disc 1

1. "Please, Please, Please" (re-issue with audience overdub) – 2:43 – James Brown & the Famous Flames
2. "In The Wee Wee Hours (Of The Nite)" – 2:39 – James Brown & the Famous Flames
3. "Again" – 2:32 – James Brown & the Famous Flames
4. "How Long Darling" – 2:57 – James Brown & the Famous Flames
5. "Caldonia" – 2:41 – James Brown and his Orchestra
6. "Evil" – 2:50 – James Brown and his Orchestra
7. "The Things That I Used to Do" – 2:49 – James Brown and his Orchestra
8. "Out of the Blue" – 2:12 – James Brown and his Orchestra
9. "So Long" – 2:45 – James Brown & the Famous Flames
10. "Dancin' Little Thing" – 2:04 – James Brown & the Famous Flames
11. "Soul Food Pt. 1" – 2:03 – Al Brisco Clark and his Orchestra
12. "Soul Food Pt. 2" – 2:22 – Al Brisco Clark and his Orchestra
13. "Out of Sight" – 2:22 – James Brown and his Orchestra
14. "Maybe The Last Time" – 2:58 – James Brown and his Orchestra
15. "Tell Me What You're Gonna Do" – 2:10 – James Brown & the Famous Flames
16. "I Don't Care" – 2:52 – James Brown & the Famous Flames
17. "Think" – 1:59 – James Brown & the Famous Flames
18. "Try Me" (re-issue with strings overdub) – 2:32 – James Brown & the Famous Flames

Disc 2

1. "Have Mercy Baby" – 2:11 – James Brown & the Famous Flames
2. "Just Won't Do Right (I Stay in the Chapel Every Night)" – 2:41 – James Brown & the Famous Flames
3. "Fine Old Foxy Self" – 2:08 – James Brown & the Famous Flames
4. Medley: "I Found Someone/Why Do You Do Me Like You Do/I Want You So Bad" – 2:09 – James Brown & the Famous Flames
5. "This Old Heart" – 2:17 – James Brown & the Famous Flames
6. "It Was You" – 2:42 – James Brown & the Famous Flames
7. "Devil's Hideaway" – 2:44 – James Brown at the Organ and his Orchestra
8. "Who's Afraid of Virginia Woolf?" – 2:43 – James Brown at the Organ and his Orchestra
9. "I Got You" (Original) – 2:27 – James Brown and his Orchestra
10. "Only You" – 2:51 – James Brown and his Orchestra
11. "Papa's Got A Brand New Bag (Part 1)" – 2:06 – James Brown & the Famous Flames
12. "Papa's Got A Brand New Bag (Part 2)" – 2:09 – James Brown & the Famous Flames
13. "Try Me" (Single Version) – 3:07 – James Brown at the Organ
14. "Papa's Got A Brand New Bag" – 2:39 – James Brown at the Organ
15. "I Got You (I Feel Good)" – 2:46 – James Brown & the Famous Flames
16. "I Can't Help It (I Just Do-Do-Do)" -2:32 – James Brown & the Famous Flames
17. "Lost Someone" – 2:42 – James Brown & the Famous Flames
18. "I'll Go Crazy" – 2:17 – James Brown & the Famous Flames
