= People (James Brown album) =

Studio album by James Brown
- Released: February 1980
- Recorded: March 6 – December 1979
- Studio: Muscle Shoals Sound (Sheffield, Alabama); The Soundshop (Nashville, Tennessee); Sound Ideas (New York City, New York)
- Genre: Funk; Soul; R&B
- Length: 35:12
- Label: Polydor; 6258
- Producer: Brad Shapiro

James Brown chronology
The Original Disco Man (1979)	People (1980)	Soul Syndrome (1980)

Singles from People
- 1. "Are We Really Dancing" Released: April 1979; 2. "Regrets / Stone Cold Drag" Released: January 1980; 3. "Let The Funk Flow / Sometimes That's All There Is" Released: March 1980

Professional ratings
Review scores
Source	Rating
AllMusic	2/5 stars
Robert Christgau	C+
The Rolling Stone Album Guide	3/5 stars

People is the 49th studio album by American musician James Brown. The album was released in March 1980 and was his last original recording for Polydor Records, after having spent nine years on the label. The front cover photograph was credited to David Alexander.

== Track listing ==
No.	Title	Writer(s)	Length
1.	"Regrets"	Barbara Wyrick	6:27
2.	"Don't Stop the Funk"	Brad Shapiro	6:04
3.	"That's Sweet Music"	Brad Shapiro, George Jackson	4:06
4.	"Let the Funk Flow"	Gary Stewart, George Jackson, Thomas Earl Jones III	6:33
5.	"Stone Cold Drag"	Brad Shapiro	4:13
6.	"Are We Really Dancing"	Brad Shapiro, Randy McCormick	4:18
7.	"Sometimes That's All There Is"	Kerry Chater, Troy Seals	3:25

== Personnel ==
=== Musicians ===
"Stone Cold Drag", "Are We Really Dancing"

- James Brown – lead vocals
- Danna Davis, Cynthia Douglas, Pamela Vincent – backing vocals
- Ben Cauley, Harrison Calloway Jr. – trumpet
- Charles Rose – trombone
- Harvey Thompson – tenor saxophone
- Ronnie Eades – baritone saxophone
- Randy McCormick, Clayton Ivy – keyboards
- Jimmy Johnson – electric guitar
- David Hood – bass guitar
- Roger Hawkins – drums

- Troy Seals – electric guitar ("Regrets", "Let The Funk Flow", "Sometimes That's All There Is")

=== Production ===
- Brad Shapiro – arrangement
