= Handful of Soul =

Studio album by James Brown
- Released: November 1966
- Recorded: May 20 – August 16, 1966
- Studio: unknown studio (New York City, New York); Arthur Smith Studios (Charlotte, North Carolina)
- Genre: Soul
- Length: 39:01
- Label: Smash; 67087
- Producer: James Brown

James Brown chronology
It's a Man's Man's Man's World (1966)	Handful of Soul (1966)	James Brown Sings Christmas Songs (1966)

Singles from James Brown Plays New Breed (The Boo-Ga-Loo)
- 1. "Let's Go Get Stoned" Released: November 1966

Professional ratings
Review scores
Source	Rating
AllMusic	3/5 stars
The Rolling Stone Album Guide	3/5 stars

Handful of Soul is the fourteenth studio album by American musician James Brown. All instrumental, it features Brown at the organ. The album was released in November 1966, by Smash Records.

== Track listing ==
No.	Title	Writer(s)	Length
1.	"Let's Go Get Stoned"	Jo Armstead, Nickolas Ashford, Valerie Simpson	3:19
2.	"Hold On, I'm Comin'"	Isaac Hayes, David Porter	2:36
3.	"Our Day Will Come"	Bob Hilliard, Mort Garson	3:58
4.	"A Message to Michael"	Burt Bacharach, Hal David	3:47
5.	"The King"	James Brown, Nat Jones	6:24
6.	"634-5789"	Eddie Floyd, Steve Cropper	2:55
7.	"When a Man Loves a Woman"	Andrew Wright, Calvin Lewis	3:16
8.	"Hot Mix"	McKinley Johnson, Ted Wright	2:19
9.	"Oh! Henry"	James Brown, Nat Jones	5:00
10.	"Get Loose"	James Brown, Nat Jones	5:22

== Personnel ==
- James Brown – organ
- Dud Bascomb, Waymon Reed, Joe Dupars, Ron Harper, Fielder Floyd or Reunald Jones – trumpet
- Richard Harris – trombone
- Levi Rasbury – valve trombone
- Nat Jones – alto saxophone, arrangement
- Pee Wee Ellis, Eldee Williams, St. Clair Pinckney, Clifford Jordan or Kiane Zawadi – tenor saxophone
- Haywood Henry, St. Clair Pinckney – baritone saxophone
- Ernie Hayes or Albert Dailey Jr. – piano
- Jimmy Nolen, Alfonzo Kellum, Billy Butler or Wallace Richardson – guitar
- Jimmy Tyrell, Bernard Odum – bass
- Panama Francis, Jabo Starks – drums
