= Stay with Me (James Brown song) =

"Stay With Me"

Single by James Brown

from the album Soul Syndrome
- B-side: "Smokin' & Drinkin'"
- Released: March 1981
- Genre: Funk, disco
- Length: 4:09
- Label: TK; 1042
- Songwriter(s): Bobby Byrd; Susaye Brown
- Producer(s): James Brown

James Brown charting singles chronology
"Rapp Payback (Where Iz Moses)" (1980)	"Stay With Me" (1981)	""The Night Time Is the Right Time (To Be With the One That You Love)" (B-side of "Bring It On...Bring It On")" (1983)

Audio video
- "Stay With Me" on YouTube

"Stay With Me" is a song recorded by James Brown. Released as a single in 1981, it charted #80 R&B. It also appeared on the album Soul Syndrome.
