= You've Got the Power (James Brown song) =

Single by James Brown and Bea Ford

from the album Think!
- A-side: "Think"
- Released: May 1960
- Recorded: 1960
- Genre: Rhythm and blues
- Length: 2:40
- Label: Federal; 12370
- Songwriter(s): James Brown; Johnny Terry

James Brown charting singles chronology
"Think" (1960)	"You've Got the Power" (1960)	"This Old Heart" (1960)

Audio video
- "You've Got The Power" on YouTube

"You've Got the Power" is a song written by James Brown and Famous Flames member Johnny Terry and recorded by Brown with Bea Ford as a duet in 1960. Released as the B-side of Brown and the Famous Flames' hit recording of "Think", it also charted, reaching #14 R&B and #86 Pop. It was Brown's first recorded duet and his first hit B-side. Brown briefly performs the song in a medley on his 1963 album Live at the Apollo.

An alternate take of "You've Got the Power" is included on the 1998 compilation album James Brown's Original Funky Divas.
