= Love Over-Due =

Studio album by James Brown
- Released: July 23, 1991
- Recorded: 1991
- Studio: Criteria Recording Studios, North Miami, Florida
- Genre: Funk
- Length: 36:09
- Label: Scotti Bros. Records
- Producer: James Brown

James Brown chronology
I'm Real (1988)	Love Over-Due (1991)	Universal James (1993)

Love Over-Due is the 55th studio album by American musician James Brown. The album was released on July 23, 1991, by Scotti Bros. Records.

Professional ratings
Review scores
Source	Rating
AllMusic	3/5 stars
Entertainment Weekly	B
NME	5/10
Rolling Stone	3/5 stars
The Rolling Stone Album Guide	4/5 stars
The Windsor Star	A

== Track listing ==
All tracks composed by James Brown; except where indicated

No.	Title	Writer(s)	Length
1.	"(So Tired of Standing Still We Got) Move On"		5:12
2.	"Show Me"	James Brown, Adrienne Brown	4:27
3.	"Dance, Dance, Dance to the Funk"	"Sweet" Charles Sherrell	5:13
4.	"Teardrops On Your Letter"	Henry Glover; arranged by James Brown	4:13
5.	"Standing On Higher Ground"	Danny Countess, Hollie Farris; arranged by Ronald Laster	4:13
6.	"Later for Dancing"	Vernon Cheely, Tony Cook	4:22
7.	"You Are My Everything"		5:21
8.	"It's Time to Love (Put a Little Love In Your Heart)"		3:11

== Charts ==
Chart (1991)	Peak position
Australian Albums (ARIA)	167
