= Unity (Afrika Bambaataa and James Brown song) =

"Unity Part 1 (The Third Coming)"
- Cover of the 12" version

Single by Afrika Bambaataa and James Brown
- B-side: "Unity Part 2 (Because It's Coming)"
- Released: August 1984
- Recorded: June 1984, Unique Studios, New York, NY
- Genre: Electro, funk, hip hop
- Length: 3:20 (Part 1); 3:30 (Part 2)
- Label: Tommy Boy/Warner Bros. Records; 00847
- Songwriters: James Brown; Khayan Aasim Bambaataa; Douglas Wimbish; Bernard Alexander; Keith LeBlanc; Robin Halpin
- Producers: Tom Silverman; Afrika Bambaataa

Afrika Bambaataa singles chronology
"Wildstyle" (1983)	"Unity Part 1 (The Third Coming)" (1984)	"Bambaataa's Theme" (1986)

James Brown singles chronology
"Bring It On...Bring It On" (1983)	"Unity Part 1 (The Third Coming)" (1984)	"Living in America" (1985)

Audio video
- "Unity, Pt. 1 (The Third Coming)" on YouTube

"Unity" is a song recorded by Afrika Bambaataa and James Brown as a duet in 1984. It was the first recording in which Brown collaborated with a performer associated with hip hop, a then-new idiom heavily influenced by Brown's own funk music. The record's title and its cover showing the two performers clasping hands express solidarity between the two styles. The song's music is similar in its structure to Brown's own funk songs of the late 1960s and 1970s, but uses the drum machine and keyboard-generated timbres of electro. The song's rapped lyrics are on the themes of "Peace, unity, love, and having fun". The single charted #87 R&B.

"Unity" contains several references to Brown's earlier recordings. The song's a cappella opening paraphrases the beginning of his 1970 songs "Get Up, Get Into It and Get Involved", "Soul Power" and an instrumental passage in the middle of part 1 is borrowed from his 1969 hit "Give It Up or Turnit a Loose".

== Music video ==
A videotape was shot of the vocal recordings of the song in Studio A at Unique Recording Studios, NYC. The tape was given to Fred Seibert and Alan Goodman of Fred/Alan Inc. to make into an inexpensive music video. The team worked with their in-house producer/director Tom Pomposello and creative director Marcy Brafman and Peter Caesar to create the video.

The video entered rotation on MTV in mid-October 1984.

== Personnel ==
- James Brown - co-lead vocal
- Afrika Bambaataa - co-lead vocal
- "Chops" - horns
- Brian Banks- keyboards
- Anthony Marinelli - keyboards
- Robin Halpin - keyboards
- Skip McDonald - guitar
- Doug Wimbish - bass
- Keith LeBlanc - drums

== 12" version ==
A six-part version of "Unity" was released as a 12" record:

1. Unity (Part 1: The Third Coming) - 3:20
2. Unity (Part 2: Because It's Coming) - 3:20
3. Unity (Part 3: Nuclear Wildstyle) - 3:29
4. Unity (Part 4: Can You See It) - 6:47
5. Unity (Part 5: The Light) - 4:15
6. Unity (Part 6: World War 3) - 2:44
