= James Brown Plays New Breed (The Boo-Ga-Loo) =

Studio album by James Brown
- Released: March 1966
- Recorded: February 7–8, 1966
- Studio: Criteria Studios (Miami, Florida)
- Genre: Soul
- Length: 40:19
- Label: Smash; 27080
- Producer: James Brown

James Brown chronology
Mighty Instrumentals (1966)	James Brown Plays New Breed (The Boo-Ga-Loo) (1966)	It's a Man's Man's Man's World (1966)

Singles from James Brown Plays New Breed (The Boo-Ga-Loo)
- 1. "New Breed" Released: March 1966; 2. "James Brown's Boo-Ga-Loo (Fat Bag) / Lost In A Mood Of Changes" Released: June 1966

Professional ratings
Review scores
Source	Rating
AllMusic	3/5 stars
The Rolling Stone Album Guide	3/5 stars

James Brown Plays New Breed (The Boo-Ga-Loo) is the twelfth studio album by American musician James Brown. The album was released in March of 1966 by Smash Records.

== Track listing ==
All tracks are written by James Brown and Nat Jones; except where indicated.

No.	Title	Writer(s)	Length
1.	"New Breed"		3:42
2.	"Slow Walk"	Sil Austin	5:46
3.	"Vonshelia"		5:54
4.	"Fat Bag"		4:16
5.	"Jabo"		2:35
6.	"Lost In The Mood Of Changes"		2:00
7.	"All About My Girl"		6:25
8.	"Hooks"		2:30
9.	"Sumpin' Else"		7:11

== Personnel ==
- James Brown – piano ("New Breed", "Lost In The Mood Of Changes", "Hooks"), organ (remainder of titles)

The Jewels

- Martha High, Grace Ruffin, Sandra Bears – vocals

The James Brown Orchestra

- Joe Dupars, Waymon Reed, Ron Harper – trumpet
- Levi Rasbury – valve trombone
- Nat Jones – alto saxophone, arrangement
- St. Clair Pinckney, Eldee Williams – tenor saxophone
- Charles Carr – baritone saxophone
- Jimmy Nolen, Alfonzo Kellum – guitar
- Bernard Odum – bass
- Jabo Starks – drums

== Charts ==
Chart (1966)	Peak position
US Billboard Top LPs	101
