= Rapp Payback (Where Iz Moses) =

Single by James Brown

from the album Soul Syndrome
- B-side: "Rapp Payback (Pt. II) (Where Iz Moses)"
- Released: November 1980
- Recorded: September 1980, Master Sound Studios, Atlanta, GA
- Genre: Funk, disco
- Length: 4:40; 3:28 (Pt. II)
- Label: TK; 1039
- Songwriter(s): Susaye Brown; James Brown; Henry Stallings
- Producer(s): James Brown

James Brown charting singles chronology
"Regrets" (1979)	"Rapp Payback (Where Iz Moses)" (1980)	"Stay With Me" (1981)

Audio video
- "Rapp Payback" on YouTube

"Rapp Payback (Where Iz Moses)" is a song performed by James Brown. It is a disco reworking of his 1974 song "The Payback". Released as a two-part single on TK Records in 1980, it charted #46 R&B. It also appeared on the album Soul Syndrome.

Brown performed the song on the December 13, 1980 episode of Saturday Night Live, alongside a medley of his earlier hit songs.
