= Static (James Brown song) =

Single by James Brown

from the album I'm Real
- A-side: "No static (Full Force 8 minute Def Mix"
- B-side: "Godfather Runnin' the Joint"
- Released: July 1988
- Genre: Funk, new jack swing
- Length: 4:02
- Label: Scotti Bros.
- Songwriter(s): Curt Bedeau, Gerry Charles, Hugh L Clarke, Brian George, Lucien George, Paul George
- Producer(s): Full Force

James Brown charting singles chronology
"I'm Real" (1988)	"Static" (1988)	"Gimme Your Love" (1989)

Audio video
- "Static" on YouTube

"Static" is a 1988 song written by Full Force and recorded by James Brown. It was released as a single from Brown's album I'm Real and was charted at number 5 in the Billboard Hot R&B/Hip-Hop Songs chart. Reviewing the album, People singled "Static" out for praise, calling it "inflammatory". It contains samples of four songs, "I Know You Got Soul", "Hot Pants (I'm Coming, I'm Coming, I'm Coming)", "Alice, I Want You Just for Me", and "Hot Pants Road". It was the last Top 40 hit of Brown's career.

The song's title inspired the identity of the DC Comics superhero Static.

It was a James brown sample that big daddy Kane used
