= This Old Heart =

Single by James Brown and The Famous Flames

from the album Think!
- B-side: "Wonded When You're Coming Home"
- Released: 1960
- Genre: Rhythm and blues
- Length: 2:08
- Label: Federal
- Songwriter(s): James Brown

James Brown charting singles chronology
""You've Got the Power" (B-side of "Think")" (1960)	"This Old Heart" (1960)	"The Bells" (1960)

Audio video
- "This Old Heart" on YouTube

"This Old Heart" is a song written by James Brown and recorded by Brown and The Famous Flames. Although they performed it in a rhythm and blues style, it originated as a country song. Released as a single in 1960, it charted #20 R&B and #79 pop, staying on the chart for five weeks between September-October 1960. It was the group's last release on Federal Records before they switched to its parent label, King. It was also one of their first songs to be released in the United Kingdom (by Fontana).
