= Muscle Shoals Horns =

American brass section of session musicians

The Muscle Shoals Horns
- Origin: Muscle Shoals, Alabama, U.S.
- Years active: Late 1960s–mid-1980s, 2015
- Past members: Harrison Calloway Jr. Ronnie Eades; Harvey Thompson; Charles Rose

The Muscle Shoals Horns is an American brass section of session musicians who performed on many rhythm and blues and rock records between the late 1960s to the present, as well as making their own recordings which included the 1976 R&B chart hit "Born To Get Down".

The performers include Harrison Calloway Jr. (trumpet), Ronnie Eades (baritone saxophone), Harvey Thompson (saxophone, flute), and Charles Rose (trombone). Calloway, Eades and Thompson met while at Tennessee State University in Nashville, and began performing with local bands and, on one occasion, young guitarist Jimi Hendrix. Together with Rose, they began recording together at the FAME Studios in Muscle Shoals in the late 1960s, and performed on 300 albums, by musicians including Bob Dylan, B.B. King, and Elton John, often working with the musicians of the Muscle Shoals Rhythm Section.

The Muscle Shoals Horns also achieved commercial success in their own right, releasing three albums under their own name, with four records on the R&B singles chart in 1976-77 – "Born To Get Down (Born To Mess Around)" (#8), "Open Up Your Heart" (#47), "Bump De Bump Yo Boodie" (#63), and "Dance To The Music" (#57). They also released three albums – Born To Get Down (1976), Doin' It To The Bone (1977), and Shine On (1983) – and were credited on the 1975 DJM album Elton John Band featuring John Lennon and the Muscle Shoals Horns. The four members reunited in 2015 after a 30-year break, with a performance to mark the release of their recordings on CD.

Harrison Calloway, seen by the other members as "the father of the group", died in Jackson, Mississippi on April 30, 2016, aged 75, following a stroke.

The Original Muscle Shoals Horns were inducted into the Musicians Hall of Fame and Museum in 2019.
