= Regrets (James Brown song) =

Single by James Brown

from the album People
- B-side: "Stone Cold Drag"
- Released: January 1980
- Genre: Funk, disco
- Length: 4:08
- Label: Polydor; 2054
- Songwriter(s): Barbara Wyrick
- Producer(s): Brad Shapiro

James Brown charting singles chronology
"Star Generation" (1979)	"Regrets" (1980)	"Rapp Payback (Where Iz Moses)" (1980)

Audio video
- "Regrets" on YouTube

"Regrets" is a 1980 single for James Brown. It was a hit for him that year, registering on both the Billboard and Cash Box charts.

== Background ==
It was composed by Barbara Wyrick. Originally written for Marie Osmond, it was instead recorded by James Brown. Backed with "Stone Cold Drag", it was released as a single on Polydor 2054 in 1980. It also appeared on the album People.

== Reception ==
Writing in The Village Voice, Thulani Davis described it as "sentimental, nice enough but not at all compelling."

It was reviewed by Cash Box in the magazine's January 19, 1980 issue. The reviewer referred to it as an easy ballad and said that it was nicely arranged.

Brown's album People was reviewed in the March 1 issue of Cash Box. With the reviewer both letting the reader know that it was a departure from the uncut funk he did previously and that he wasn't ready to stop the funk yet, the reviewer said that "Regrets" was the most sensitive piece that Brown had done in years. The single was also reviewed by Mike Gardner of Record Mirror that week. Going through the nicknames of Brown, Gardner said that he had finally decided to exercise his excellent vocal chords on something other than the frantic urgings to get on the good foot. He also said that Brown sounded like a watered down Bobby Womack.

The album People was also reviewed by ''Record World in the magazine's March 1 issue. It was one of the picks of the week. With the reviewer saying Brown executes his vocals like no one else can, the reviewer also said, "With "Regrets" already on the charts, look for action with "Stone Cold Drag" to back it up".

== Airplay ==
It was noted by Cash Box in the January 19, 1980 issue as a programmers pick, by Jerry Rushien of WEDR in Miami.

== Charts ==
The single debuted at no. 92 on the Cash Box Top 100 on the week of February 23. It held that position for another week with its last position of no. 98 on week three.

The single debuted at no. 74 on the Record World Black Oriented Singles chart on the week of February 23. It held that position for one more week.

It reached #63 on the Billboard R&B chart.
