= Ain't That a Groove =

"Ain't That a Groove Part 1"

Single by James Brown

from the album It's a Man's Man's Man's World
- B-side: "Ain't That a Groove Part 2"
- Released: February 1966
- Recorded: December 13 (track) and 22 (rhythm guitar overdub), 1965
- Studio: Bell Sound (New York City)
- Genre: Soul
- Length: 2:39 (Part 1); 1:47 (Part 2)
- Label: King (6025)
- Songwriter(s): James Brown; Nat Jones
- Producer(s): James Brown

James Brown charting singles chronology
"I'll Go Crazy" (1966)	"Ain't That a Groove Part 1" (1966)	"It's a Man's Man's Man's World" (1966)

"Ain't That a Groove" is a song written by James Brown and Nat Jones. Brown recorded it in 1965 with the female vocal group The Jewels and a studio band arranged and conducted by Sammy Lowe. Released in edited form as a two-part single in 1966, it charted #6 R&B and #42 Pop. The unedited studio recording of the song was included in the 1991 box set Star Time.

Cash Box described the single as a "rhythmic, throbbing chorus-backed romancer about a lucky twosome who seem aptly suited to each other."

Brown performs a live version of "Ain't That a Groove" on his 1967 album Live at the Garden He also performed the song live with his vocal group The Famous Flames on a 1966 telecast of the Ed Sullivan Show with The Jewels singing background offstage.

The single was also featured in Dead Presidents.
