= Bring It On...Bring It On =

Single by James Brown

from the album Bring It On!
- B-side: "The Night Time Is the Right Time (To Be With the One That You Love)"
- Released: April 1983
- Recorded: 1983
- Genre: Funk
- Length: 4:04
- Label: Churchill/Augusta (94023)
- Songwriter(s): James Brown; Joe Brown
- Producer(s): James Brown

James Brown singles chronology
"Stay With Me" (1981)	"Bring It On...Bring It On" (1983)	"Unity" (1984)

Audio video
- "Bring It On" on YouTube

"Bring It On...Bring It On" is a song written and performed by James Brown. The recording was released as a single in 1983 on the independent Churchill/Augusta record label. The song failed to chart in the United States, but reached #45 on the UK Singles Chart. (The album's B-side, the R&B standard "The Night Time Is the Right Time (To Be With the One That You Love)", did chart #73 R&B in the US) "Bring It On" also appeared on the album Bring It On!.
