= Joe Sherman (musician) =

- Origin: The Bronx, New York, U.S.
- Genres: Jazz
- Instrument(s): Tenor saxophone, alto saxophone, violin

Joseph Sherman is an American educator and musician living in the Bronx.

== Education ==
Sherman graduated from Stuyvesant High School in 1962. He studied in the Industrial and Labor Relations college at Cornell University before transferring to Ithaca College, where he studied saxophone performance.

== Career ==
Sherman taught mathematics in the public schools of New York City before being named the founding principal of Morris High School, the first New York public high school to utilize an experimental, alternative mode of public education.

Although possessing a background as a jazz tenor saxophone player and bandleader, Sherman studied the violin, became a private violin teacher, and joined the Bronx Symphony Orchestra in 1981 as a violinist, later being named its conductor and managing director.
