= Bring It On! (James Brown album) =

Studio album by James Brown
- Released: May 1983
- Recorded: 1983
- Genre: Funk
- Length: 28:45
- Label: Augusta Sound
- Producer: James Brown

James Brown chronology
Nonstop! (1981)	Bring It On! (1983)	Gravity (1986)

Singles from Bring It On!
- 1. "Bring It On...Bring It On / The Night Time Is The Right Time" Released: May 1983

Professional ratings
Review scores
Source	Rating
AllMusic	3/5 stars
The Rolling Stone Album Guide	3.5/5 stars

Bring It On! is the 52nd studio album by American musician James Brown, released in 1983 on independent label Churchill/Augusta Sound. It was released in an LP format as a vinyl album. The songs were recorded with Jimmy Nola, Arthur Dickson and J.B.'s Internationals.

The album was briefly available on compact disc in the late 1980s through Spectrum Records, but remains one of the few James Brown albums to not make it into the streaming era.

== Credits ==
The album's Producer is James Brown, Art Director is Sherman Brooks, and Photographer was done by Gina Halsey.

== Track listing ==
No.	Title	Writer(s)	Length
1.	"Bring It On...Bring It On"	James Brown, Joe Brown	4:04
2.	"Today"	Brown	5:05
3.	"You Can't Keep a Good Man Down"	Brown	4:50
4.	"Tennessee Waltz"	Redd Stewart	3:26
5.	"Night Time Is the Right Time"	Herman	5:40
6.	"For Your Precious Love"	Arthur Brooks, Jerry Butler, Richard Brooks	5:40
