= Hollie Farris =

- Genres: Funk, soul jazz
- Occupations: Musician, band leader
- Instruments: Trumpet, vocals
- Years active: 1960s–present

Hollie Farris is a professional musician, a trumpet player who has played and recorded with James Brown and was a member of The J.B.'s. He is the co-composer of "Standing On Higher Ground" which appears on the Love Over-Due album by Brown. He has played on Colour Me Free! and The Soul Sessions Vol. 2 albums by Joss Stone. He was also a member of Steve Winwoods touring band.

== Career ==
=== With James Brown ===
Farris would end up playing with James Brown, playing trumpet, adding vocals and eventually becoming music director in the band. The relationship began in 1975 when Farris was located in Nashville. He was playing with his band in an Atlanta hotel lounge when James Brown came in and heard them play. He hired Farris immediately. During the course of his involvement with Brown, in the 1970s, when Muhammad Ali was having his first fight with Leon Spinks, Farris and the band were invited to Ali's suite after a sparring session and spent 2 hours talking to him. Farris was caught off guard by Ali's humor. In 1986 he became the music director which included the duties of rehearsing the band, adding new songs to be worked with etc. After spending eight years with Brown, Farris quit after a series of bad experiences and stayed away for seven years. He would return to the band after Brown was released from prison and stay with him for another sixteen years. By 2007, Farris had spent 20 years in that role. Ferris's musical relationship with Brown lasted until the singers passing.

=== Other artists ===
In 1988, he was a member of Steve Winwoods backing band that also featured saxophonist Randall Bramblett, guitarist Anthony Cranford, drummer Russ Kunkel, keyboardist Mike Lawler, backing vocalist LeAnn Phelan, and bassist Michael Rhodes. Farris appeared in the 1989 Roll with It music video by Winwood.

In 2007, he was a member of Joss Stone's backing band.

== Appearances / session work (selective) ==
Artist	Title	Release info	Year	Track(s)	Role	Notes
Gordon Payne	Gordon Payne	A&M 4725	1978		Trumpet	
James Brown	Love Over-Due	Scotti Brothers 32084	1991		Composer, alto sax, trumpet	
Denny Jiosa	Body 2 Body	1201 Music 5018	2002		Composer, flugelhorn, trumpet	
Denny Jiosa	Dreams Like This	CD Baby / Sonic Canvas SC0312	2008		Main Personnel, trumpet	
Denny Jiosa	Moving Pictures	Blo Records 0000002502	1995		Composer, trumpet	
