= Hey America (album) =

Studio album by James Brown
- Released: December 1970
- Recorded: October 6, 1970 (instrumentals); October 7, 1970 (vocals); October 8, 1970 (strings, vibes); October 19, 1970 (Track 5 vocals)
- Studio: King Studios (Cincinnati, Ohio); Bobby Smith Studios (Macon, Georgia) (Track 5 vocals)
- Genre: Funk; Christmas
- Length: 34:06
- Label: King
- Producer: James Brown

James Brown chronology
Sex Machine (1970)	Hey America (1970)	Super Bad (1971)

Singles from Hey America
- 1. "Hey America" Released: December 1970; 2. "Santa Claus Is Definitely Here to Stay" Released: December 1970

Professional ratings
Review scores
Source	Rating
AllMusic	2/5 stars
The Rolling Stone Album Guide	2.5/5 stars

Hey America is the 30th studio album by American musician James Brown. The album was released in 1970 by King Records.

== Track listing ==
All tracks are written by Nat Jones; except where indicated.

No.	Title	Writer(s)	Length
1.	"Hey America"	Addie Williams, Nat Jones	3:36
2.	"A Lonely Little Boy Around One Little Christmas Toy"		4:01
3.	"Go Power At Christmas Time"		3:11
4.	"Christmas Is Love"		6:01
5.	"Santa Claus Is Definitely Here to Stay"		4:22
6.	"My Rapp"		6:01
7.	"I'm Your Christmas Friend, Don't Be Hungry"		3:10
8.	"Merry Christmas My Baby and a Very, Very Happy New Year"		3:54
Total length:			34:06

== Personnel ==
- James Brown – vocals
- unknown – trumpet
- unknown – trombone
- unknown – saxophone
- Nat Jones, Bobby Byrd – organ
- unknown – vibraphone
- David Matthews – piano
- unknown – strings
- Kenny Poole – guitar
- unknown – bass
- William “Beau Dollar” Bowman – drums
