= Roots of a Revolution =

Compilation album by James Brown
- Released: 1989 (UK); 1995 (US)
- Recorded: February 4, 1956 – June 6, 1964
- Genre: Soul
- Length: 108:15
- Label: Polydor
- Producer: Various

James Brown chronology
| Motherlode (1988) | Roots of a Revolution (1989) | Foundations of Funk (1996) |

Professional ratings
Review scores
| Source | Rating |
|---|---|
| Allmusic | 4.5/5 stars |

Roots of a Revolution is the first of several James Brown era overviews released by Polydor Records in the mid-1990s. Expanding on the 1984 double LP compilation of the same name it covers 1956 to 1963, but omits some of Brown's big hits from that time period, which can be found on Star Time. Most of the songs were recorded by Brown with his original vocal group, The Famous Flames, who received label credit on the LP version.

== Track listing ==
All tracks composed by James Brown; except where indicated

Disc 1

1. "I Feel That Old Feeling Coming On" (Nafloyd Scott, Nashpendle Knox)
2. "No, No, No, No"
3. "Hold My Baby's Hand" (Bobby Byrd, James Brown, Nafloyd Scott, William Lee Diamond Smith)
4. "Chonnie-On-Chon" (Bobby Byrd, James Brown, Nafloyd Scott, William Lee Diamond Smith)
5. "Just Won't Do Right"
6. "Let's Make It"
7. "Fine Old Foxy Self"
8. "Why Does Everything Happen to Me"
9. "Begging, Begging" (Jessy D. Dixon, Rudolph Toombs)
10. "That Dood It" (Rose Marie McCoy, Rudolph Toombs)
11. "There Must Be a Reason"
12. "I Want You So Bad"
13. "Don't Let It Happen to Me"
14. "Bewildered" (Leonard Whitcup, Teddy Powell)
15. "Doodle Bug" (Instrumental) (James Brown, J.C. Davis)
16. "This Old Heart"
17. Studio Dialogue
18. "I'll Never Let You Go"
19. Studio Dialogue
20. "You've Got The Power" (duet with Bea Ford) (James Brown, Johnny Terry)
21. "Baby, You're Right" (James Brown, Joe Tex)
22. "I Don't Mind"

Disc 2

1. "Come Over Here"
2. "And I Do Just What I Want"
3. "Just You and Me, Darling"
4. "So Long"
5. "Tell Me What You're Gonna Do"
6. "Hold It" (Billy Butler, Clifford Scott)
7. "Dancin' Little Thing" (Hank Ballard)
8. "You Don't Have to Go"
9. "Lost Someone" (Baby Lloyd Stallworth, Bobby Byrd, James Brown)
10. "Shout and Shimmy"
11. "I Found You"
  - Vocals by Yvonne Fair
12. "I Don't Care"
13. "I've Got Money"
14. "Mashed Potatoes U.S.A."
15. "Signed, Sealed and Delivered"
16. Studio Dialogue
17. "Prisoner of Love" (Clarence Gaskill, Leo Robin, Russ Columbo)
18. "I Cried"
  - Vocals by Tammy Montgomery
19. "Oh Baby Don't You Weep Pts 1 & 2"
20. "(Do The) Mashed Potatoes"
21. "Maybe The Last Time" (Ted Wright)
