= Think! (James Brown album) =

Studio album by James Brown and The Famous Flames
- Released: November 1960
- Recorded: January 30, 1959 – September 29, 1960
- Studio: Beltone Studios (New York City, New York); King Studios (Cincinnati, Ohio); United Studios (Los Angeles, California)
- Genre: Rhythm and blues, soul
- Length: 30:13
- Label: King

James Brown and The Famous Flames chronology
Try Me! (1959)	Think! (1960)	The Amazing James Brown (1961)

Singles from Think!
- 1. "Good Good Lovin'" Released: October 29, 1959; 2. "I'll Go Crazy" Released: January 1960; 3. "Think"/"You've Got the Power" Released: May 1960; 4. "This Old Heart" Released: August 1960; 5. "Bewildered" Released: January 1961; 6. "Baby You're Right" Released: July 11, 1961

Professional ratings
Review scores
Source	Rating
AllMusic	3/5 stars
The Rolling Stone Album Guide	4/5 stars

Think! is the third studio album by James Brown and The Famous Flames, featuring the hit singles "Baby You're Right" and their cover of "Bewildered", along with the group's hit cover of the title track, "Think" originally recorded by The "5" Royales. It also includes the national hits "I'll Go Crazy", "This Old Heart" and "Baby, You're Right", the 1959 regional hit "Good Good Lovin'", and Brown's B-side hit duet with Bea Ford, "You've Got the Power". In all, the album features no less than seven national Pop and R&B chart hits, and a few regional hits as well.

== Track listing ==
All tracks are written by James Brown; except where indicated.

No.	Title	Writer(s)	Length
1.	"Think"	Lowman Pauling	2:50
2.	"Good Good Lovin'"	James Brown, Albert Shubert
3.	"Wonder When You're Coming Home"		2:33
4.	"I'll Go Crazy"		2:09
5.	"This Old Heart"		2:11
6.	"I Know It's True"		2:43
7.	"Bewildered"	Teddy Powell, Leonard Whitcup	2:25
8.	"I'll Never Let You Go"		2:20
9.	"You've Got the Power"	James Brown, Johnny Terry	2:22
10.	"If You Want Me"		2:26
11.	"Baby, You're Right"	James Brown, Joe Tex	3:07
12.	"So Long"	Remus Harris, Irving Melsher, Russ Morgan	2:50

== Personnel ==
- James Brown – lead vocals
- Bill Hollings, Johnny Terry, J.W. Archer or Willie Johnson, Louis Madison, Bobby Bennett, Baby Lloyd Stallworth, Bobby Byrd – backing vocals
- Bea Ford – co-vocals ("You've Got The Power")
- Roscoe Patrick – trumpet
- George Dorsey, James McGary, Alfred Corley – alto saxophone
- J.C. Davis, Alfred Corley – tenor saxophone
- Louis Madison – organ
- Louis Madison, Sonny Thompson, Lucas “Fats” Gonder – piano
- Bobby Roach, Les Buie – guitar
- Bernard Odum, Hubert Lee Perry – bass
- Nat Kendrick – drums
