= James Brown Sings Christmas Songs =

Studio album by James Brown
- Released: November 1966
- Recorded: October 17–19, 1966
- Studio: King Studios (Cincinnati, Ohio)
- Genre: Soul, Christmas
- Length: 42:11
- Label: King; 1010
- Producer: James Brown

James Brown chronology
Handful of Soul (1966)	James Brown Sings Christmas Songs (1966)	James Brown Sings Raw Soul (1967)

Singles from James Brown Sings Christmas Songs
- 1. "The Christmas Song" Released: November 1966; 2. "Sweet Little Baby Boy" Released: November 1966; 3. "Let's Make Christmas Mean Something This Year" Released: December 1966

Professional ratings
Review scores
Source	Rating
AllMusic	3/5 stars
The Rolling Stone Album Guide	2/5 stars

James Brown Sings Christmas Songs is the thirteenth studio album and first Christmas album by American musician James Brown. The album was released in November 1966, by King Records. It charted for 11 weeks peaking at #13 on Billboard's Best Bets For Christmas album chart December 16, 1967.

== Track listing ==
All tracks are written by James Brown and Nat Jones; except where specified.

No.	Title	Writer(s)	Length
1.	"Let's Make Christmas Mean Something This Year"		6:30
2.	"Sweet Little Baby Boy Part 1"		2:40
3.	"Sweet Little Baby Boy Part 2"		2:35
4.	"Merry Christmas, I Love You"		2:30
5.	"Signs of Christmas"		4:38
6.	"The Christmas Song (Version 2)"	Robert Wells, Mel Tormé	2:45
7.	"Merry Christmas Baby"	Lou Baxter, Johnny Moore	3:54
8.	"The Christmas Song (Version 1)"	Robert Wells, Mel Tormé	2:40
9.	"Please Come Home for Christmas"	Charles Brown, Gene C. Redd	3:20
10.	"This Is My Lonely Christmas Part 1"	Gene C. Redd, James Brown	3:00
11.	"This Is My Lonely Christmas Part 2"	Gene C. Redd, James Brown	4:45
12.	"Christmas In Heaven"	Billy Ward	2:54

== Personnel ==
- James Brown – lead vocals, organ ("This Is My Lonely Christmas Part 1"), piano ("This Is My Lonely Christmas Part 2")

The Charmaines

- Gigi Griffin, Dee Watkins, Irene Vinegar – backing vocals

The James Brown Orchestra

- Frank Brown, Denny Bayliss, Dick Coghill – trumpet
- Levi Rasbury – valve trombone
- Nat Jones – alto saxophone, arrangement
- Pee Wee Ellis, Gordon Brisker, James McGary – tenor saxophone
- James McGary – baritone saxophone
- Joe Sherman, Ray Castillo, Ron Konieczka, Herman Wasserman – violin
- Bobby Byrd – organ, electric piano
- Jimmy Nolen – guitar
- Michael Moore – bass
- Clyde Stubblefield – drums
