= I'm Real (album) =

Studio album by James Brown
- Released: 1988
- Recorded: 1988
- Genre: Funk, new jack swing
- Length: 45:02
- Label: Scotti Bros. Records
- Producer: Full Force

James Brown chronology
Gravity (1986)	I'm Real (1988)	Love Over-Due (1991)

Alternative cover
- This cover was released in the UK and other countries.

Singles from I'm Real
- 1. "I'm Real" Released: April 1988; 2. "Static" Released: July 1988

Professional ratings
Review scores
Source	Rating
AllMusic	3/5 stars
Robert Christgau	B
The Rolling Stone Album Guide	3.5/5 stars

I'm Real is the 54th studio album by American musician James Brown. The album was released in 1988 on Scotti Bros. Records. All of the tracks were produced, written and arranged by Full Force, with the exception of "I'm Real" (co-written by Full Force and Brown) and "It's Your Money $" (written and produced solely by Brown).

== Track listing ==
All tracks composed by James Brown and Full Force; except where indicated

No.	Title	Length
1.	"Tribute (Full Force)"	0:22
2.	"I'm Real"	5:33
3.	"Static (Part 1 & 2)"	4:51
4.	"Time To Get Busy"	5:15
5.	"You And Me"	4:36
6.	"Interview"	0:46
7.	"She Looks All Types A' Good"	5:22
8.	"Keep Keepin'"	5:28
9.	"Can't Git Enuf"	4:43
10.	"It's Your Money $"	5:35
11.	"Godfather Runnin' the Joint (Full Force)"	2:31

== Personnel ==
- James Brown - lead vocals
- Full Force (B-Fine (drums), Shy Shy (bass), Paul Anthony (vocals), Bowlegged Lou (vocals), 'Curt-T-T' Bedeau (guitar), Baby Gerry (keyboards)).- music, arrangements, backing vocals
- Baby Gerry (Gerard Charles) - scratches
- Maceo Parker - saxophone on "You and Me", "She Looks All Types A' Good" and "Keep Keepin'"
