= It's a Man's Man's Man's World (album) =

Compilation album by James Brown
- Released: August 1966
- Recorded: January 30, 1959 – February 16, 1966
- Studios: Beltone Studios (New York City, New York); United Studios (Los Angeles, California); Bell Sound Studios (New York City, New York); Talent Masters Studios (New York City, New York)
- Genres: Rhythm and blues, soul
- Length: 31:17
- Labels: King; 985
- Producers: Billy Ward, Burt Jones, Henry Glover, James Alston, James Brown, Leonard Witchcup, Nat Jones, Sally Nix, Teddy Powell

James Brown chronology
James Brown Plays New Breed (The Boo-Ga-Loo) (1966)	It's a Man's Man's Man's World (1966)	Handful of Soul (1966)

Singles from It's a Man' Man's Man's World
- 1. "Ain't That a Groove" Released: February 1966; 2. "It's a Man's Man's Man's World" Released: April 1966

Professional ratings
Review scores
Source	Rating
AllMusic	3/5 stars
The Rolling Stone Album Guide	3.5/5 stars

It's a Man's Man's Man's World is a compilation album by American musician James Brown. It consists of tracks from his period with the King label, as well as the tracks "It's a Man's Man's Man's World", "Is It Yes or Is It No?", and Ain't That a Groove (Parts 1 and 2), all released on singles in 1966. In addition, this album also includes three previously released songs by Brown with his vocal group, the Famous Flames (Bobby Bennett, Bobby Byrd, and Lloyd Stallworth). The hit songs, "Bewildered" and "I Don't Mind", and the song, "Come Over Here", which was the B-side to the Brown /Famous Flames hit, "Shout and Shimmy."

The album was released in August of 1966 by King.

== Track listing ==
All tracks are written by James Brown; except where specified.

No.	Title	Writer(s)	Length
1.	"The Scratch"	James Alston	1:42
2.	"It's A Man's Man's Man's World"	James Brown, Betty Jean Newsome	2:47
3.	"Bewildered"	Teddy Powell, Leonard Whitcup	2:21
4.	"Is It Yes Or Is It No?"	Burt Jones, James Brown	2:57
5.	"Ain't That A Groove Part 1"	James Brown, Nat Jones	3:33
6.	"The Bells"	Billy Ward	3:00
7.	"Ain't That A Groove Part 2"	James Brown, Nat Jones	1:46
8.	"Come Over Here"		2:42
9.	"In The Wee Wee Hours (Of The Nite)"		2:48
10.	"I Don't Mind"		2:19
11.	"Just You And Me"		2:42
12.	"I Love You, Yes I Do"	Henry Glover, Sally Nix	2:44
