= Santa Claus Is Definitely Here to Stay =

"Santa Claus Is Definitely Here to Stay (Vocal)"

Single by James Brown

from the album Hey America
- B-side: "Santa Claus Is Definitely Here to Stay" (Sing Along)
- Released: 1970
- Genre: Funk, Christmas
- Length: 4:21 (Vocal); 4:21 (Sing Along)
- Label: King; 6340
- Songwriter: Nat Jones
- Producer: James Brown

James Brown charting singles chronology
"Super Bad (Part 1 & Part 2)" (1970)	"Santa Claus Is Definitely Here to Stay (Vocal)" (1970)	"Get Up, Get into It, Get Involved Pt. 1" (1970)

Audio video
- "Santa Claus Is Definitely Here To Stay" on YouTube

"Santa Claus Is Definitely Here to Stay" is a Christmas song recorded by James Brown. Released in 1970 as a single, it also appeared in re-recorded form on the album Hey America.
