= I'm Real (James Brown song) =

Single by James Brown

from the album I'm Real
- B-side: "Tribute"
- Released: April 1988
- Genre: Funk, hip hop, new jack swing
- Length: 4:30
- Label: Scotti Bros. 07783
- Songwriters: Curt Bedeau; Gerry Charles; Hugh L Clarke; Brian George; Lucien George; Paul George; James Brown
- Producer: Full Force

James Brown charting singles chronology
"The Payback Mix" (1986)	"I'm Real" (1988)	"Static" (1988)

Audio video
- "I'm Real" on YouTube

"I'm Real" is a hip-hop-R&B song recorded by James Brown. It was co-written and produced by Full Force and appeared on Brown's 1988 album of the same name. The song's horn section is reminiscent of both "Soul Power" and "Think (About It)" Released as a single the same year, it charted #2 R&B. Described in Rolling Stone as "[Brown's] I'm-the-original rapper song", its lyrics assert his primacy and relevance as a performer over and against the many musicians who sample his work.

== Charts ==
Chart (1988)	Peak position
Italy Airplay (Music & Media)	19
