= Hey America =

"Hey America Vocal"

Single by James Brown

from the album Hey America
- B-side: "Hey America Sing Along"
- Released: 1970
- Genre: Funk, Christmas music
- Length: 3:42 (Vocal); 3:42 (Sing Along)
- Label: King; 6339
- Songwriters: Nat Jones; A. William Jones
- Producer: James Brown

Audio video
- "Hey America" on YouTube

"Hey America" is a Christmas song recorded by James Brown. It appeared on his 1970 Christmas album of the same name. It was released as a single that failed to make the charts in the United States, but reached #47 on the UK Singles Chart in 1971.

Spin magazine characterizes the song as "a churning, overwrought orchestral groove, over which JB apparently improvises a totally incoherent rant about Christmas, peace protesters, God, partying, and (tellingly) wine."
