= Super Bad (song) =

"Super Bad (Part 1 & Part 2)"

Single by James Brown

from the album Super Bad
- B-side: "Super Bad (Part 3)"
- Released: October 2, 1970
- Recorded: June 30, 1970, Starday-King Studios, Nashville, TN
- Genre: Funk
- Length: 4:05 (Parts 1 & 2); 4:05 (Part 3); 9:03 (complete version)
- Label: King; 6329
- Songwriter: James Brown
- Producer: James Brown

James Brown charting singles chronology
| "Get Up I Feel Like Being Like a Sex Machine (Part 1)" (1970) | "Super Bad (Part 1 & Part 2)" (1970) | "Santa Claus Is Definitely Here to Stay Vocal" (1970) |

Audio sample
- file; help

Music video
- "James Brown - Super Bad (Parts 1 & 2) ft. The Original J.B.s" on YouTube

"Super Bad", originally titled Call Me Super Bad, is a 1970 song by James Brown. Originally released as a three-part single, it went to #1 on the R&B chart and number 13 on the Billboard Hot 100. The song's lyrics include the refrain "I've got soul and I'm super bad." The positive use of the word "bad" is an example of linguistic reappropriation, which Brown had done before in "Say It Loud - I'm Black and I'm Proud".

The song includes a tenor saxophone solo by Robert McCollough, during which Brown yells, "Blow me some Trane, brother!"

A reverbed version with overdubbed audience applause was released on a 1971 album of the same name. He performed the song on Soul Train on February 10, 1973.

== Personnel ==
- James Brown - lead vocal

with The J.B.'s:

- Clayton "Chicken" Gunnells - trumpet
- Darryl "Hasaan" Jamison - trumpet
- Robert McCollough - tenor saxophone
- Bobby Byrd - Hammond organ
- Phelps "Catfish" Collins - guitar
- William "Bootsy" Collins - bass
- John "Jabo" Starks - drums
- Johnny Griggs - congas

== Chart positions ==
| Chart (1970) | Peak position |
|---|---|
| U.S. Billboard Hot 100 | 13 |
| U.S. Billboard R&B | 1 |

== Appearances and references in media ==
- The song is prominently featured in the 2002 film The New Guy, where the song was sampled by rapper Mystikal in the song "The New Guy".
- In a Boondocks strip, Michael Caesar interrupts his elementary school class to recite the song lyrics.
- An exclusive remix of this song was featured on the video game Gran Turismo 4.
- A dance remix of this song was featured on the soundtrack to the 2005 animated film Robots.
- The song is featured in the film White Men Can't Jump.
- The Dutch techno band Human Resource used a lyrical interpolation of James Brown's "I wanna kiss myself" for their 1991 hardcore track Dominator.
- The song is featured in the 1996 film The Nutty Professor, which is used by Reggie Warrington (Dave Chappelle) as his theme song.
- The song is featured in the 1999 film Bowfinger.
- The song is featured heavily in the 2011 commercials for the Toronto Blue Jays on Rogers Sportsnet
- The song is featured in a 2011 commercial for Gatorade.
- The song is featured in one of the first segments of Ken Burns' Baseball: The Tenth Inning.
- The song provided the title for both the novel Superbad by Ben Greenman and the Judd Apatow film of the same name.
- The song was released as downloadable content for Rock Band 3 on August 2, 2011.
- The song was featured on NASCAR on Fox promos in 2001.
- It was featured on an ABC ident in the 1990s.
