= Hip-O Records =

American record label

- Parent company: Universal Music Group
- Founded: 1996
- Founder: Doug Morris
- Distributor: Universal Music Enterprises (In the US)
- Genre: Various
- Country of origin: U.S.
- Official website: hiporecords.com

Hip-O Records is a record label that specializes in reissues and compilations. It is part of Universal Music Group. Established in 1996, the label has distributed releases from 'out of style' genres such as disco and early hip-hop music as well as publishing film soundtracks. The label's name is a pun on the name 'hippo'.

== History ==
The name "Hip-O Records" is a play on the word "hip" and the already-existing Rhino Records. The formation of Hip-O Records has its roots in Universal Music Group Chairman & CEO Doug Morris' relationship with Rhino. As co-Chairman of Atlantic Records during the early 1990s and then President & C.O.O. of Warner Music Group (U.S.), Morris observed Rhino's great financial success at cross country rivals Capitol/EMI. EMI had taken an equity position in Rhino Records as an ideal two way relationship. Rhino provided invaluable assistance in the packaging and marketing of EMI's catalog, and EMI provided Rhino with increasingly difficult to access master recordings. Their association had been extremely prestigious and profitable for both. During a 1992 renegotiation, Morris took a 50% stake in Rhino, which only energized the profitability and success of both.

Morris left Warner Music Group in 1995 during an internal shake-up and immediately landed at what was then called MCA Music Entertainment Group. He recognized the history of the group's labels provided a parallel opportunity to market the vintage catalog of masters, but Rhino's magical executive team was tied up tight in the deal he signed with them at Atlantic. Morris launched his own catalog label that shadowed Rhino Records in every way, down to the company's name.

Today, as part of Universal Music Group, Hip-O reissues many albums from UMG's huge back catalogue - including such labels as Decca, Interscope, Geffen, A&M, Mercury, Polydor, MCA, Island and others.

== Hip-O Select ==
Hip-O Select, Hip-O's limited edition reissue label, was co-founded by UMe VP Pat Lawrence and former Rhino Records exec Thane Tierney. It released remastered classics by artists including The Supremes, Chuck Berry, Rupert Holmes, Bo Diddley, Ken Nordine, Etta James, Dobie Gray, The Miracles, Burt Bacharach, Tammi Terrell, Doug Sahm, and Muddy Waters, among others. It released the Complete Motown Singles, a series of fourteen box sets which include both sides of every single from Motown Records and its subsidiaries during that company's Detroit era. Their catalog includes a number of previously unreleased albums and compilations from the Motown, Mercury, Polydor, MCA, ABC, A&M, Dot, Decca, and 20th Century Records vaults. Hip-O Select also released a multi-volume set of James Brown's complete singles.

Unlike limited releases made by competitor Rhino Handmade, Hip-O Select has its catalog available for purchase on iTunes.

In 2015, Vivendi pulled the plug on Hip-O Select and all of the Hip-O Select titles are now out of print.

== See also ==
- List of record labels
