= Foundations of Funk – A Brand New Bag: 1964–1969 =

Compilation album by James Brown
- Released: March 19, 1996
- Recorded: 1964–1969
- Genre: Funk
- Length: 149:11
- Label: Polydor
- Producer: Various

James Brown chronology
Roots of a Revolution (1995)	Foundations of Funk – A Brand New Bag: 1964–1969 (1996)	Funk Power 1970: A Brand New Thang (1996)

Foundations of Funk – A Brand New Bag: 1964–1969 is the second of several James Brown era overviews released by Polydor Records in the mid-1990s. Expanding on the 1984 LP compilation Ain’t That a Groove - The James Brown Story 1966–1969 it covers 1964 to 1969.

Professional ratings
Review scores
Source	Rating
Allmusic	link
eMusic	5/5 stars

== Track listing ==
Disc 1

1. "Out of Sight" - 2:22
2. "Papa's Got a Brand New Bag, Pts. 1 & 2" - 4:16
3. "I Got You (I Feel Good)" - 2:45
4. "Money Won't Change You, Pts. 1 & 2" - 4:15
5. "Introduction/Out of Sight/Bring It Up" (Live) - 5:54
  - previously unreleased live version. Later released on 2009's Live at the Garden (Expanded Edition).
6. "Let Yourself Go" - 3:57
7. "There Was a Time" - 4:25
8. "Cold Sweat, Pts. 1 & 2" - 7:23
9. "Get It Together, Pts. 1 & 2" - 8:57
10. "Goodbye My Love, Pts. 1 & 2" - 5:36
11. "I Can't Stand Myself (When You Touch Me), Pts. 1 & 2" - 7:19
12. "I Got The Feelin'" - 3:05
  - previously unreleased extended version
13. "The Popcorn" - 4:30
  - previously unreleased complete version
14. "Cold Sweat" (false start and studio dialogue) - 0:23
  - previously unreleased false start
15. "Cold Sweat" (Alternate Take) - 6:50
  - previously unreleased alternate take

Disc 2

1. "Licking Stick—Licking Stick" (Live) - 4:15
  - previously unreleased live version. Later released on 1998's Say It Live and Loud: Live in Dallas 08.26.68.
2. "Say It Loud—I'm Black And I'm Proud, Pts. 1 & 2" - 4:50
3. "Give It Up Or Turnit a Loose" - 4:30
4. "You Got To Have a Mother for Me" - 5:39
  - previously unreleased original mix
5. "I Don't Want Nobody To Give Me Nothing (Open Up The Door I'll Get It Myself)" - 9:43
  - previously unreleased complete version
6. "Let a Man Come In and Do The Popcorn, Pts. 1 & 2" - 7:47
7. "It's a New Day, Pts. 1 & 2" - 6:25
8. "Ain't It Funky Now" - 9:28
9. "Brother Rapp" - 7:00
  - previously unreleased original mix
10. "Funky Drummer, Pts. 1 & 2" - 5:34
11. "She's The One" - 2:59
12. "Mother Popcorn" (Live) - 9:02
  - previously unreleased undubbed complete version

== Personnel ==
=== Musicians ===
Artist	Primary Artist	Guest Artist	Drums	Congas	Organ	Guitar	Bass	Sax (Alto)	Sax (Baritone)	Sax (Tenor)	Trumpet	Trombone	Trombone (valve)	MC	Vocals	Vocals (Background)
James Brown	Yes				Yes											
Beau Dollar Bowman			Yes													
Les Buie						Yes										
Bobby Byrd		Yes			Yes											
Charles Carr									Yes							
Al "Brisco" Clark										Yes						
Joseph Davis											Yes					
Tim Drummond							Yes									
Joe Dupars											Yes					
Pee Wee Ellis		Yes			Yes			Yes		Yes						Yes
Alvin "Fats" Gonder					Yes											
Richard "Kush" Griffith											Yes					
Dicky Harris												Yes				
Timothy Hedding					Yes											
Haywood Henry									Yes							
McKinley Johnson											Yes					
Nat Jones			Yes					Yes								
Alphonso "Country" Kellum						Yes	Yes									Yes
Art Lopez				Yes												Yes
Jimmy Nolen						Yes										Yes
Bernard Odum							Yes									
Maceo Parker		Yes							Yes	Yes						Yes
Melvin Parker			Yes													Yes
St. Clair Pinckney		Yes							Yes	Yes					Yes	Yes
Levi Rasbury													Yes	Yes		Yes
Waymon Reed											Yes					Yes
Wallace Richardson						Yes										
Eddie Setser						Yes										
Sweet Charles Sherrell							Yes									Yes
John Starks			Yes													
Clyde Stubblefield			Yes												Yes	
Sam Fan Thomas							Yes									
Ron Tooley											Yes					
James Tyrell							Yes									
Teddy Washington											Yes					
Fred Wesley		Yes										Yes				Yes
Eldee Williams										Yes						Yes
Artist	Primary Artist	Guest Artist	Drums	Congas	Organ	Guitar	Bass	Sax (Alto)	Sax (Baritone)	Sax (Tenor)	Trumpet	Trombone	Trombone (valve)	MC	Vocals	Vocals (Background)

=== Production ===
Person	Composer	Engineer	Digital Remastering	Producer	Executive Producer	Project Coordinator	Project Assistant	Compilation Producer	Liner Notes	Design	Photography
James Brown	Yes			Yes							
Bobby Byrd	Yes										
Nat Jones	Yes										
Pee Wee Ellis	Yes										
Alfred Ellis (aka Pee Wee Ellis)	Yes										
Bud Hobgood	Yes										
Hank Ballard	Yes										
Charles Bobbit	Yes										
Ted Wright (James Brown pseudonym)	Yes										
David Harrison		Yes									
Ron Lenhoff		Yes									
Gary N. Mayo			Yes								
Bill Levenson					Yes						
Terri Tierney						Yes					
Catherine Ladis							Yes				
Alan Leeds								Yes	Yes		
Harry Weinger								Yes	Yes		
Sheryl Lutz-Brown										Yes	
Charles Stewart											Yes
