= Sex Machine (album) =

Studio album and live album by James Brown
- Released: September 1970
- Recorded: June 12, 1969 – Criteria Studios (Miami, Florida) ("Lowdown Popcorn"); October 14, 1969 – King Studios (Cincinnati, Ohio) ("Brother Rapp"); July 23, 1970 – King Studios (Cincinnati, Ohio) ("Get Up I Feel Like Being a Sex Machine", medley); October 1, 1969 – Bell Auditorium (Augusta, Georgia) (remainder of titles)
- Genres: Funk; soul
- Length: 64:29
- Labels: King; 1115
- Producer: James Brown

James Brown chronology
It's a New Day – Let a Man Come In (1970)	Sex Machine (1970)	Hey America (1970)

James Brown live albums chronology
Live at the Apollo, Volume II (1968)	Sex Machine (1970)	Revolution of the Mind: Recorded Live at the Apollo, Vol. III (1971)

Singles from Sex Machine
- 1. "Lowdown Popcorn" Released: August 9, 1969; 2. "Brother Rapp" Released: April 1970; 3. "Get Up (I Feel Like Being a) Sex Machine" Released: July 1970; 4. "Spinning Wheel" Released: 1971

Professional ratings
Review scores
Source	Rating
Allmusic	4.5/5 stars
Billboard	(favorable)
Christgau's Record Guide	A
Rhapsody	(favorable)
Rolling Stone	4.5/5 stars
Spin	(favorable)
Yahoo! Music	(favorable)
Zagat Survey	5/5 stars
Sputnikmusic	4.5/5 stars

Sex Machine is a 1970 double album by James Brown. It showcases the playing of the original J.B.'s lineup featuring Bootsy and Catfish Collins, and includes an 11-minute rendition of the album's title song, different from the original recording of the title song which was released as a two-part single in 1970.

Sex Machine purports to be a live recording. However, the first LP's worth of material consists of tracks recorded in studio settings with added reverberation and overdubbed applause (some of which subsequently were released in unadulterated mixes, most notably on the 1996 Funk Power compilation CD.). All but one track of the second LP apparently were recorded live in concert in Brown's hometown of Augusta, Georgia, although this material, too, features added reverb and overdubbed applause.

Sex Machine is often considered to be one of the greatest and most important funk records of all time, and arguably the high point of Brown's creative heyday from 1967 to 1971. It was ranked 1st in SPIN magazine's 25 greatest albums of all time in 1989, and 96th in a 2005 survey held by British television's Channel 4 to determine the 100 greatest albums of all time. Sex Machine was also voted the 34th greatest album of all time in a VH1 poll of over 700 musicians, songwriters, disc jockeys, radio programmers, and critics in 2003. In Rolling Stone's 2020 edition of The 500 Greatest Albums of All Time, it was ranked number 439.

== Contents ==
All tracks on sides one and two and "Lowdown Popcorn" on side three are studio recordings with added reverberation and audience noise. All other tracks on sides three and four were recorded live at the Bell Auditorium in Augusta, GA.

"Brother Rapp" and "Lowdown Popcorn" are the same studio performances initially released as singles. Audience-free studio versions of "Get Up I Feel Like Being a Sex Machine" and "Give It Up or Turnit a Loose" appear on the CD compilation Funk Power 1970: A Brand New Thang, along with a previously unreleased take of "There Was a Time" from the same session. "Mother Popcorn", which was indeed recorded live, appears without added audience noise and with a longer running time on the CD compilation Foundations of Funk: A Brand New Bag 1964-1969. In addition, the album Motherlode includes a live rendition of "Say It Loud - I'm Black and I'm Proud" purportedly from the same Augusta concert. The full 1969 Augusta concert was released in 2019 as Live At Home With His Bad Self.

== Chart performance ==
The album peaked at No. 4 on the Billboard Best Selling Soul LP's and at No. 29 on the Top LP's. It reached No. 46 on the Cashbox Top 100 Albums chart as well.

== Track listing ==
Side one (studio tracks produced to sound live)
No.	Title	Writer(s)	Length
1.	"Get Up I Feel Like Being a Sex Machine"	James Brown, Bobby Byrd, Ron Lenhoff	10:48
2.	"Brother Rapp (Part I & Part II)"	Brown	5:06
Total length:			15:54

Side two (studio tracks produced to sound live)
No.	Title	Writer(s)	Length
1.	"Bewildered"	Teddy Powell, Leonard Whitcup	6:09
2.	"I Got the Feelin'"	Brown	1:07
3.	"Give It Up or Turnit a Loose"	Charles Bobbit	6:26
Total length:			13:42

Side three
No.	Title	Writer(s)	Length
1.	"I Don't Want Nobody to Give Me Nothing (Open Up the Door I'll Get It Myself)"	Brown	4:31
2.	"Licking Stick - Licking Stick"	Brown, Byrd, Pee Wee Ellis	1:19
3.	"Lowdown Popcorn" (studio recording)	Brown	3:25
4.	"Spinning Wheel"	David Clayton-Thomas	4:02
5.	"If I Ruled the World"	Leslie Bricusse, Cyril Ornadel	4:03
Total length:			17:20

Side four
No.	Title	Writer(s)	Length
1.	"There Was a Time"	Brown, Bud Hobgood	4:04
2.	"It's a Man's Man's Man's World"	Brown, Betty Jean Newsome	3:42
3.	"Please, Please, Please"	Brown, Johnny Terry	2:26
4.	"I Can't Stand Myself (When You Touch Me)"	Brown	1:28
5.	"Mother Popcorn"	Brown, Ellis	5:50
Total length:			17:30

== Personnel ==
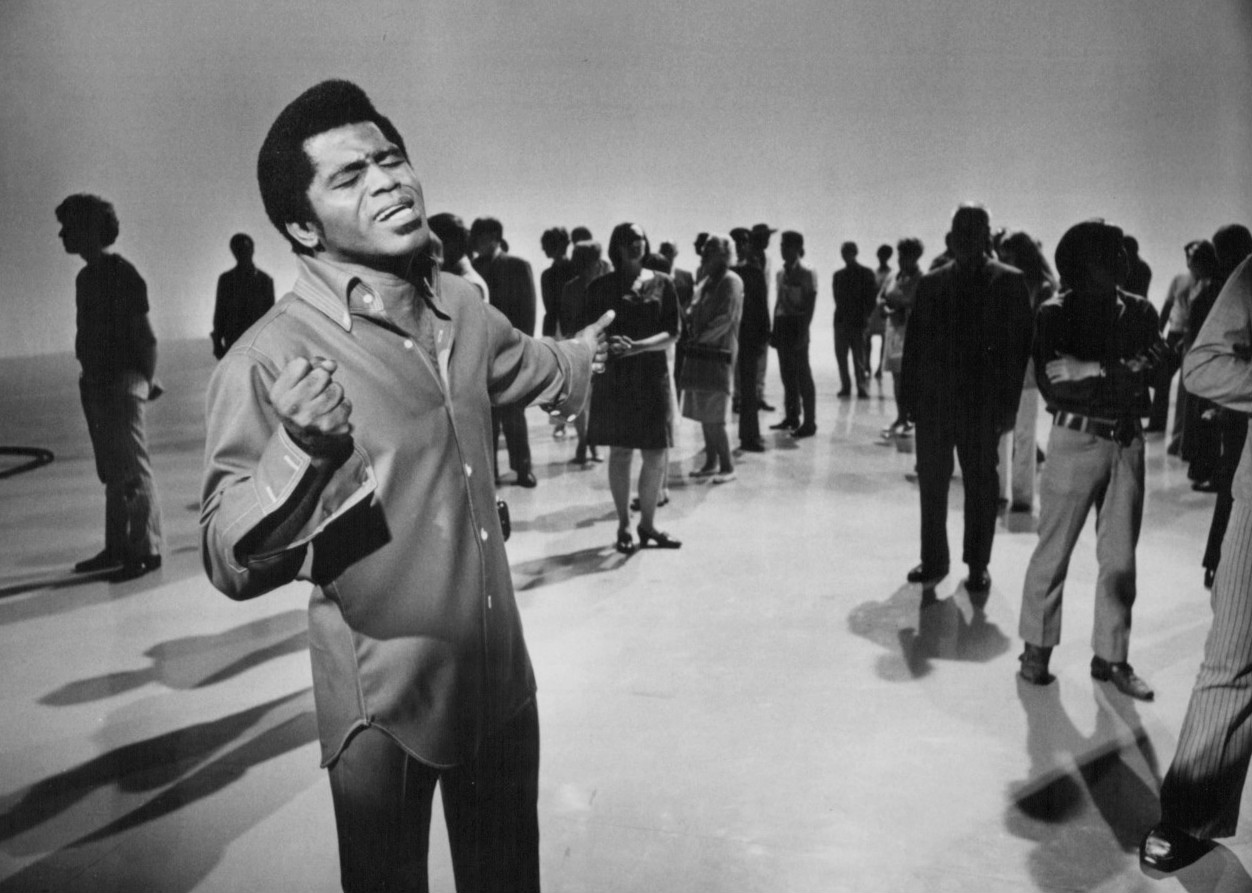
Brown on the TV show The Music Scene in September 1969

Get Up (I Feel Like Being a) Sex Machine, Medley

- James Brown – vocals, piano (Sex Machine)
- Clayton "Chicken" Gunnels – trumpet
- Darryl "Hassan" Jamison – trumpet
- Robert "Chopper" McCollough – tenor sax
- Bobby Byrd – organ, vocals (Sex Machine)
- Phelps "Catfish" Collins – guitar
- William "Bootsy" Collins – bass
- John "Jabo" Starks – drums (Sex Machine)
- Clyde Stubblefield – drums (Medley)
- Johnny Griggs – congas (Medley)

Bell Auditorium, Augusta, GA

- James Brown – vocals, organ (Spinning Wheel)
- Richard "Kush" Griffith – trumpet
- Joe Davis – trumpet
- Fred Wesley – trombone
- Maceo Parker – tenor sax, organ, emcee
- Eldee Williams – tenor sax
- St. Clair Pinckney – tenor and baritone sax
- Jimmy Nolen – guitar
- Alphonzo Kellum – guitar
- Sweet Charles Sherrell – bass
- Clyde Stubblefield – drums
- John "Jabo" Starks – drums
- Melvin Parker – drums

== Charts ==
Chart peaks for Sex Machine
Chart (1970)	Peak position
US Billboard Top LPs	29
US Billboard Best Selling Soul LPs	4
US Cashbox Top 100 Albums	46
