= I Can't Stand Myself When You Touch Me =

Studio album by James Brown
- Released: March 1968
- Recorded: January 25 – October 30, 1967
- Studio: Beltone Studios (New York City, New York); RCA Studios (New York City, New York); Apollo Theater (New York City, New York); King Studios (Cincinnati, Ohio); Mastersound Studios (Atlanta, Georgia)
- Genre: Funk
- Length: 43:06
- Label: King; 1030
- Producer: James Brown

James Brown chronology
| Cold Sweat (1967) | I Can't Stand Myself When You Touch Me (1968) | I Got the Feelin' (1968) |

Singles from I Can't Stand Myself When You Touch Me
- 1. "Get It Together" Released: October 1967; 2. "The Soul of J.B." Released: November 1967; 3. "I Can't Stand Myself (When You Touch Me) / There Was a Time" Released: November 1967; 4. "You've Got to Change Your Mind" Released: February 1968

Professional ratings
Review scores
| Source | Rating |
|---|---|
| AllMusic | 3/5 stars |
| The Rolling Stone Album Guide | 3/5 stars |

I Can't Stand Myself When You Touch Me is the eighteenth studio album by American musician James Brown. The album was released in March 1968, by King Records.

== Chart performance ==
The album debuted on Billboard magazine's Top LP's chart in the issue dated March 23, 1968, peaking at No. 17 during a fourteen-week run on the chart.

== Track listing ==
| No. | Title | Writer(s) | Length |
|---|---|---|---|
| 1. | "I Can't Stand Myself (When You Touch Me), Pt. 1" | James Brown | 3:22 |
| 2. | "There Was a Time" | James Brown, Bud Hobgood | 3:35 |
| 3. | "Get It Together, Pt. 1" | James Brown, Bud Hobgood, Alfred Ellis | 3:43 |
| 4. | "Baby, Baby, Baby, Baby" | James Brown, Bud Hobgood, James Crawford | 4:22 |
| 5. | "Time After Time" | Jule Styne, Sammy Cahn | 2:57 |
| 6. | "The Soul of J.B." (instrumental) | James Brown, Bud Hobgood, Gladys Knochelman | 3:01 |
| 7. | "I Can't Stand Myself (When You Touch Me), Pt. 2" | James Brown | 4:10 |
| 8. | "Get It Together, Pt. 2" | James Brown, Bud Hobgood, Alfred Ellis | 4:43 |
| 9. | "Why Did You Take Your Love Away from Me" | James Brown, Bud Hobgood | 3:02 |
| 10. | "Need Your Love So Bad" | Little Willie John | 3:24 |
| 11. | "You've Got to Change Your Mind" | James Brown, Bobby Byrd, Gene Redd, Ron Lenhoff | 3:48 |
| 12. | "Funky Soul #1" (instrumental) | James Brown, Bud Hobgood, James Crawford | 2:09 |

== Personnel ==
- James Brown – vocals, organ

The James Brown Orchestra

- Waymon Reed, Joe Dupars, Dud Bascomb, Joe Newman – trumpet
- Richard Harris, Jimmy Cleveland, Garnett Brown – trombone
- Levi Rasbury – valve trombone
- Pee Wee Ellis – alto saxophone
- Maceo Parker, Eldee Williams, Pee Wee Ellis – tenor saxophone
- St. Clair Pinckney – baritone saxophone
- Pee Wee Ellis – organ
- Ernie Hayes – piano
- Jimmy Nolen, Alfonzo Kellum, Wallace Richardson, Carl Lynch – guitar
- Bernard Odum, Al Lucas – bass
- Ron Selico – congas
- Jabo Starks, Bernard Purdie – drums

The Dapps ("I Can't Stand Myself (When You Touch Me)", "The Soul of J.B.", "Funky Soul #1")

- probably Ron Geisman – trumpet
- Pee Wee Ellis – alto saxophone
- Les Asch – tenor saxophone
- David Parkinson – baritone saxophone
- Tim Hedding – organ, piano
- Troy Seals, “Fat Eddie” Setser – guitar
- Tim Drummond – bass
- Beau Dollar – drums

== Charts ==
| Chart (1963) | Peak position |
|---|---|
| US Billboard Top LPs | 17 |
