= Get It Together (James Brown song) =

1967 single by James Brown

"Get It Together (Part 1)"

Single by James Brown

from the album I Can't Stand Myself When You Touch Me
- B-side: "Get It Together (Part 2)"
- Released: October 1967
- Recorded: September 5, 1967
- Studio: Mastersound Studios (Atlanta, Georgia)
- Genre: Soul; Funk
- Length: 3:50 (Part 1); 3:50 (Part 2)
- Label: King; 6122
- Songwriters: James Brown; Bud Hobgood; Alfred Ellis
- Producer: James Brown

James Brown charting singles chronology
"Cold Sweat - Part 1" (1967)	"Get It Together (Part 1)" (1967)	"I Can't Stand Myself (When You Touch Me)" (1967)

Audio video
- "Get It Together (Pt. 1 & 2)" on YouTube

"Get It Together" is a song performed by James Brown. Released in October 1967 as a two-part single, it charted #11 R&B and #40 Pop. Both parts also appeared on the album I Can't Stand Myself When You Touch Me. Donald A. Guarisco of Allmusic described the song as "a taut, minimalist tune that combines soulful but frantically paced verse melodies with a bubbling, two-note staccato chorus."

Brown performs "Get It Together" in the concert films James Brown: Man to Man and Live at the Boston Garden: April 5, 1968.

== Personnel ==
- James Brown – lead vocal

with the James Brown Orchestra:

- Waymon Reed – trumpet
- Joe Dupars – trumpet
- Levi Rasbury – valve trombone
- Alfred "Pee Wee" Ellis – alto saxophone
- Maceo Parker – tenor saxophone
- St. Clair Pinckney – baritone saxophone
- Alfonzo Kellum – electric guitar
- Bernard Odum – bass guitar
- John "Jabo" Starks – drums

== Gittin' A Little Hipper ==
"Gittin' A Little Hipper"

Single by The Dapps featuring Alfred Ellis

from the album James Brown Plays Nothing But Soul
- A-side: "Bringing Up The Guitar"
- Released: January 1968
- Recorded: December 12, 1967
- Studio: King Studios (Cincinnati, Ohio)
- Genre: Soul; Funk
- Length: 2:59
- Label: King; 6147
- Songwriters: James Brown; Bud Hobgood
- Producer: James Brown

The Dapps singles chronology
"Gittin' A Little Hipper" (1968)	"There Was a Time" (1968)

Audio video
- "Gittin' A Little Hipper" on YouTube

An instrumental version of the "Get It Together" entitled "Gittin' A Little Hipper" arranged by Pee Wee Ellis and performed by the James Brown Orchestra was released as the B-side of the single "Bringing Up The Guitar" in January of 1968 miscredited as The Dapps. The song featured on the album James Brown Plays Nothing But Soul.

=== Personnel ===
- Waymon Reed – trumpet
- Joe Dupars – trumpet
- Alfred "Pee Wee" Ellis – alto saxophone
- Maceo Parker – tenor saxophone
- St. Clair Pinckney – baritone saxophone
- Jimmy Nolen – electric guitar
- Alfonzo Kellum – electric guitar
- Bernard Odum – bass guitar
- John "Jabo" Starks – drums
