= Funk Power 1970: A Brand New Thang =

Compilation album by James Brown

Compilation album by James Brown
- Released: June 4, 1996
- Recorded: April 25, 1970 – January 26, 1971
- Studio: Starday-King (Nashville, Tennessee); King (Cincinnati, Ohio); Criteria (Miami, Florida); Bobby Smith (Macon, Georgia); Rodel (Washington, D.C.)
- Genre: Funk
- Length: 77:59
- Label: Polydor; 531 684-2
- Producer: James Brown, Alan Leeds, Harry Weinger

James Brown chronology
Foundations of Funk (1996)	Funk Power 1970: A Brand New Thang (1996)	Make It Funky (1996)

Professional ratings
Review scores
Source	Rating
Allmusic	link

Funk Power 1970: A Brand New Thang is the third of several James Brown era overviews released by Polydor Records in the mid-1990s. This compilation covers Brown's period with a Cincinnati based band known as The Pacemakers, fronted by bassist Bootsy Collins and his older brother rhythm guitarist Catfish Collins.

== Track listing ==
No.	Title	Writer(s)	Length
1.	"Get Up I Feel Like Being A Sex Machine"	James Brown, Bobby Byrd, Ron Lenhoff	5:16
2.	"Super Bad"	James Brown	9:03
3.	"Since You Been Gone"	James Brown	4:58
4.	"Give It Up Or Turn It A Loose"	Charles Bobbit	6:24
5.	"There Was A Time (I Got To Move)"	James Brown, Bud Hobgood	7:20
6.	"Talkin' Loud And Sayin' Nothing"	James Brown, Bobby Byrd	14:42
7.	"Get Up, Get Into It, Get Involved"	James Brown, Bobby Byrd, Ron Lenhoff	7:06
8.	"Soul Power"	James Brown	12:05
9.	"Get Up I Feel Like Being A Sex Machine"	James Brown, Bobby Byrd, Ron Lenhoff	10:31
10.	"Fight Against Drug Abuse (Public Service Announcement)"		0:34
Total length:			77:59

== Personnel ==
- James Brown – lead vocals, piano
- Bobby Byrd – backing vocals, organ
- Clayton "Chicken" Gunnells, Daryl "Hasaan" Jamison – trumpet
- Fred Wesley – trombone
- Robert "Chopper" McCullough – tenor saxophone
- St. Clair Pinckney – baritone saxophone
- Phelps "Catfish" Collins, Hearlon "Cheese" Martin – guitar
- William "Bootsy" Collins – bass
- Johnny Griggs – congas
- John "Jabo" Starks, Clyde Stubblefield – drums
