= I Got the Feelin' (album) =

Studio album by James Brown
- Released: April 1968
- Recorded: January 25, 1967 – March 5, 1968
- Studio: Beltone Studios (New York City, New York); RCA Studios (New York City, New York); King Studios (Cincinnati, Ohio); Vox Studios (Los Angeles, California)
- Genre: Funk
- Length: 37:05
- Label: King; 1031
- Producer: James Brown

James Brown chronology
I Can't Stand Myself When You Touch Me (1968)	I Got the Feelin' (1968)	James Brown Plays Nothing But Soul (1968)

Singles from I Got the Feelin'
- 1. "I Got the Feelin'" Released: March 1968; 2. "You've Got The Power" Released: February 1968; 3. "Shhhhhhhh (For A Little While)" Released: April 1968; 4. "Maybe Good, Maybe Bad" Released: April 1968

Professional ratings
Review scores
Source	Rating
AllMusic	3/5 stars
The Rolling Stone Album Guide	3/5 stars

I Got the Feelin' is the nineteenth studio album by American musician James Brown. The album was released in April 1968, by King Records.

== Chart performance ==
The album debuted on Billboard magazine's Top LP's chart in the issue dated May 18, 1968, peaking at No. 135 during a fourteen-week run on the chart.

== Track listing ==
No.	Title	Writer(s)	Length
1.	"I Got the Feelin'"	James Brown	2:32
2.	"Maybe I'll Understand (Part 1)"	James Brown, Bud Hobgood, Ron Lenhoff	3:15
3.	"You've Got The Power"	James Brown, Johnny Terry	2:57
4.	"Maybe Good-Maybe Bad (Part 1)"	James Brown, Bud Hobgood	2:50
5.	"Shhhhhhh (For A Little While)"	James Brown, Bud Hobgood	2:33
6.	"Just Plain Funk"	James Brown, Bud Hobgood, Troy Seals	3:05
7.	"If I Ruled the World"	Cyril Ornadel, Leslie Bricusse	3:24
8.	"Maybe I'll Understand (Part 2)"	James Brown, Bud Hobgood, Ron Lenhoff	3:15
9.	"Stone Fox"	James Brown, Bud Hobgood	3:02
10.	"It Won't Be Me"	James Brown, Alfred Ellis	3:37
11.	"Maybe Good-Maybe Bad (Part 2)"	James Brown, Bud Hobgood	2:54
12.	"Here I Go"	James Brown, Bud Hobgood, D. Lewis	3:00

== Personnel ==
- James Brown – vocals, organ ("Shhhhhhh (For A Little While)", "Just Plain Funk"), piano ("Maybe Good-Maybe Bad", "Here I Go")
- Vicki Anderson – co-vocals ("You've Got The Power")

The James Brown Orchestra

- Waymon Reed, Joe Dupars, Dud Bascomb, Joe Newman – trumpet
- Richard Harris, Jimmy Cleveland, Garnett Brown – trombone
- Levi Rasbury – valve trombone, french horn
- Pee Wee Ellis – alto saxophone
- Maceo Parker, St. Clair Pinckney – tenor saxophone
- St. Clair Pinckney – baritone saxophone
- Ernie Hayes, probably Bobby Byrd – piano
- Marilyn Jones, Vivian Robinson – violin
- Jimmy Nolen, Alfonzo Kellum, Wallace Richardson, Carl Lynch – guitar
- Bernard Odum, Al Lucas, Alfonzo Kellum – bass
- Clyde Stubblefield, Jabo Starks, Bernard Purdie – drums

The Dapps ("Shhhhhhh (For A Little While)", "Just Plain Funk", "Here I Go")

- probably Ron Geisman – trumpet
- Pee Wee Allis – alto saxophone
- Les Asch – tenor saxophone
- David Parkinson – baritone saxophone
- Tim Hedding – organ, piano
- Troy Seals, "Fat Eddie" Setser – guitar
- Tim Drummond – bass
- Beau Dollar – drums

== Charts ==
Chart (1968)	Peak position
US Billboard Top LPs	135
