= James Brown Plays Nothing But Soul =

Studio album by James Brown
- Released: August 1968
- Recorded: December 12, 1967 – April 16, 1968
- Studio: King Studios (Cincinnati, Ohio)
- Genre: Soul jazz
- Length: 38:13
- Label: King; 1034
- Producer: James Brown

James Brown chronology
I Got the Feelin' (1968)	James Brown Plays Nothing But Soul (1968)	Thinking About Little Willie John and a Few Nice Things (1968)

Professional ratings
Review scores
Source	Rating
AllMusic	3/5 stars
The Rolling Stone Album Guide	3/5 stars

James Brown Plays Nothing But Soul is the twentieth studio album by American musician James Brown. The album was released in August 1968, by King Records.

== Chart performance ==
The album debuted on Billboard magazine's Top LP's chart in the issue dated August 24, 1968, peaking at No. 150 during a five-week run on the chart.

== Track listing ==
No.	Title	Writer(s)	Length
1.	"Soul with Different Notes"	James Brown, Clyde Stubblefield, Jimmy Nolen, Maceo Parker	8:10
2.	"Go On Now"	James Brown, Alfred Ellis, Cicely Hill	5:53
3.	"Buddy E"	James Brown, Bud Hobgood	3:56
4.	"Fat Soul"	James Brown, Alfred Ellis, Cicely Hill	9:13
5.	"Little Fellow"	James Brown, Alfred Ellis, Cicely Hill	8:12
6.	"Gittin' a Little Hipper"	James Brown, Bud Hobgood	2:47

== Personnel ==
- James Brown – organ
- Waymon Reed – trumpet
- Pee Wee Ellis – alto saxophone
- Maceo Parker – tenor saxophone
- Jimmy Nolen, Alfonzo Kellum – guitar
- Bernard Odum, Tim Drummond – bass
- Jabo Starks – drums

== Charts ==
Chart (1968)	Peak position
US Billboard Top LPs	150
