= You've Got to Change Your Mind =

Single by Bobby Byrd & James Brown

from the album I Can't Stand Myself When You Touch Me
- B-side: "I'll Lose My Mind" (Bobby Byrd only)
- Released: 1968
- Genre: Soul
- Length: 3:15
- Label: King; 6151
- Songwriter(s): Bobby Byrd; Gene Redd; James Brown; Ron Lenhoff
- Producer(s): James Brown

James Brown charting singles chronology
""There Was a Time" (B-side of "I Can't Stand Myself (When You Touch Me)")" (1967)	"You've Got to Change Your Mind" (1968)	"I Got the Feelin'" (1968)

Audio video
- "You've Got To Change Your Mind" on YouTube

"You've Got to Change Your Mind" is a song recorded as a duet between Bobby Byrd and James Brown. Released as a single in 1968, it charted #47 R&B. Brown & Byrd can be seen performing this song on the DVD set, "Live at the Boston Garden: April 5, 1968" The Extended Edition
