= It's a Mother =

Studio album by James Brown
- Released: August 1969
- Recorded: June 24, 1967 – June 12, 1969
- Studio: Apollo Theater (New York City, New York); King Studios (Cincinnati, Ohio); Criteria Studios (Miami, Florida)
- Genre: Funk; Soul; R&B
- Length: 37:08
- Label: King; 1063
- Producer: James Brown

James Brown chronology
The Popcorn (1969)	It's a Mother (1969)	Ain't It Funky (1970)

Singles from It's a Mother
- 1. "Mother Popcorn" Released: June 1969

Professional ratings
Review scores
Source	Rating
AllMusic	4/5 stars
The Rolling Stone Album Guide	3/5 stars

It's a Mother is the 26th full-length studio album by American musician James Brown. The album was released in August 1969, by King Records.

== Chart performance ==
The album debuted on Billboard magazine's Top LP's chart in the issue dated September 6, 1969, peaking at No. 26 during a twenty two-week run on the chart.

== Track listing ==
No.	Title	Writer(s)	Length
1.	"Mother Popcorn, Pt. 1"	James Brown, Alfred Ellis	3:16
2.	"Mother Popcorn, Pt. 2"	James Brown, Alfred Ellis	3:01
3.	"Mashed Potato Popcorn, Pt. 1"	James Brown	2:59
4.	"Mashed Potato Popcorn, Pt. 2"	James Brown	3:18
5.	"I'm Shook"	James Brown	2:50
6.	"Popcorn With a Feeling" (instrumental)	James Brown, Alfonzo Kellum, Clyde Stubblefield, Jimmy Nolen, St. Clair Pinckney	2:56
7.	"The Little Groove Maker Me, Pt. 1"	James Brown, Bud Hobgood	2:59
8.	"The Little Groove Maker Me, Pt. 2"	James Brown, Bud Hobgood	2:18
9.	"Any Day Now"	Burt Bacharach, Bob Hilliard	3:29
10.	"If I Ruled the World"	Cyril Ornadel, Leslie Bricusse	4:01
11.	"You're Still Out of Sight"	James Brown	3:07
12.	"Top of the Stack" (instrumental)	James Brown, Alfred Brown	2:48

== Personnel ==
- James Brown – lead vocal, organ

The James Brown Orchestra

- Richard "Kush" Griffith, Joe Davis – trumpet
- Fred Wesley – trombone
- Pee Wee Ellis – alto saxophone
- Maceo Parker – tenor saxophone
- St. Clair Pinckney – baritone saxophone, flute
- Jimmy Nolen, Alfonzo Kellum – guitar
- Sweet Charles Sherrell, Alfonzo Kellum – bass
- Clyde Stubblefield, Jabo Starks – drums

The Dapps ("I'm Shook")

- Les Asch, Ronald Lewis – tenor saxophone
- David Parkinson – baritone saxophone
- Tim Hedding – organ
- “Fat Eddie” Setser – guitar
- Bob Thorn – bass
- Beau Dollar – drums

== Charts ==
Chart (1969)	Peak position
US Billboard Top LPs	26
