= James Brown: Man to Man =

- Starring: James Brown
- Country of origin: United States

Original release
- Release: March 1968

James Brown: Man to Man is a concert film recorded live at the Apollo Theater in March 1968. It was produced by Metromedia Television and broadcast as an hour-long syndicated television special, and is one of the first color recordings of James Brown performing with his revue. The concert footage is intercut with scenes shot in Harlem and Watts accompanied by Brown's reflections on the situation of blacks in America. Writing in The New York Times, Albert Goldman described Man to Man as "fascinating in detail and overwhelming in total impact" and hailed it as a breakthrough for "offering such a long and relatively unobstructed look at a great black entertainer on his home ground."

Man to Man was released on DVD by Shout! Factory in 2008 under the title James Brown Live at the Apollo '68 as part of the box set I Got the Feelin': James Brown in the '60s.

== Songs ==
1. "If I Ruled the World"
2. "That's Life"
3. "Kansas City"
4. Medley: "It's a Man's Man's Man's World"/"Lost Someone"/"Bewildered"
5. "Get It Together"
6. "There Was a Time"
7. "I Got the Feelin'"
8. "Try Me"
9. Medley: "Cold Sweat"/"Maybe the Last Time"/"I Got You (I Feel Good)"/"Please, Please, Please"/"I Can't Stand Myself (When You Touch Me)"/"Cold Sweat" (reprise)

== See also ==
- List of American films of 1968
- Live at the Boston Garden: April 5, 1968
