= Kansas City (Leiber and Stoller song) =

1952 song by Jerry Leiber and Mike Stoller

"K. C. Loving"

Single by Little Willie Littlefield
- B-side: "Pleading at Midnight"
- Released: 1952
- Recorded: Los Angeles, August 12, 1952
- Genre: R&B
- Label: Federal
- Songwriter: Jerry Leiber and Mike Stoller

Official audio
- "K. C. Loving" on YouTube

"Kansas City" is a rhythm and blues song written by Jerry Leiber and Mike Stoller in 1952. First recorded by Little Willie Littlefield the same year, as "K. C. Loving", the song later became a chart-topping hit when it was recorded by Wilbert Harrison in 1959. "Kansas City" is one of Leiber and Stoller's "most recorded tunes, with more than three hundred versions", with several appearing in the R&B and pop record charts.

== Original song ==
"Kansas City" was written by Jerry Leiber and Mike Stoller, two nineteen-year-old rhythm and blues fans from Los Angeles. Neither had been to Kansas City, but were inspired by Big Joe Turner records.

I'm goin' to Kansas City, Kansas City here I come (2×)
They got a crazy way of lovin' there, and I'm gonna get me some
I'm gonna be standing on the corner, of Twelfth Street and Vine (2×)
With my Kansas City baby, and a bottle of Kansas City wine

Through a connection to producer Ralph Bass, they wrote "Kansas City" specifically for West Coast blues/R&B artist Little Willie Littlefield. There was an initial disagreement between the two writers over the song's melody: Leiber (who wrote the lyrics) preferred a traditional blues song, while Stoller wanted a more distinctive vocal line; Stoller ultimately prevailed. They taught the song to Littlefield at Maxwell Davis' house, who arranged and provided the tenor sax for the song. Littlefield recorded the song in Los Angeles in 1952, during his first recording session for Federal Records, a King Records subsidiary. Federal's Ralph Bass changed the title to "K. C. Loving", which he reportedly considered to sound "hipper" than "Kansas City". Littlefield's record had some success in parts of the U.S., but it did not reach the national chart.

== Little Richard versions ==
In 1955, Little Richard recorded two rather different versions of "Kansas City", both of which were not released until years later. The first version, which was close to the original song, was released in November 1970, on the compilation album Well Alright!. Little Richard substantially re-worked the song for his second version, particularly the refrain starting with words "Hey, hey, hey, hey; Hey baby, hey child, hey now". It was released in late 1958 on The Fabulous Little Richard and in April 1959 as a single.

On May 9, 1956, Little Richard recorded "Hey-Hey-Hey-Hey", also known as "Hey-Hey-Hey-Hey! (Goin' Back to Birmingham)", which was similar to a part of the second version of "Kansas City" recorded six months earlier. Credited to Richard, it was released in January 1958 as the B-side of "Good Golly, Miss Molly" and in July 1958 on Little Richard.

== Wilbert Harrison version ==
"Kansas City"

Single by Wilbert Harrison
- B-side: "Listen, My Darling"
- Released: April 1959
- Recorded: New York City, March 1959
- Genre: R&B
- Length: 2:22
- Label: Fury
- Songwriter: Jerry Leiber and Mike Stoller
- Producer: Bobby Robinson

Official audio
- "Kansas City" on YouTube

In 1959, after several years of performing Littlefield's "K. C. Loving", Wilbert Harrison decided to record the song. In March 1959, after Little Richard's version was released, Harrison, with a trio including guitarist Wild Jimmy Spruill, recorded it in a New York studio for producer Bobby Robinson of Fury Records. "Kansas City" was released on a single by Fury later that year.

Although the song's arrangement varied little from Littlefield's, it "struck such a solid shuffle groove that it was unforgettable", with inspired rhythm and solo guitar work by Spruill. Harrison's song was issued with Leiber and Stoller's original name, "Kansas City", but changed the refrain to "They got some crazy little women there, and I'm gonna get me one" and dropped one twelve-bar section.

Shortly after the song's release, several other versions appeared. Billboard magazine's pop song pick of the week for March 30, 1959, listed five different releases of "Kansas City": Harrison's and versions by Hank Ballard and The Midnighters, Rocky Olson, Rockin' Ronald & the Rebels, and a reissue by Littlefield. A week later, the magazine announced the single release of a version by Little Richard. Although Ballard's and Richard's versions both appeared in the lower reaches of the Billboard charts, Harrison's was a runaway hit, reaching number one in both the R&B and pop charts, where it remained for seven weeks, and became one of the top selling records of 1959. In Belgium, the single reached numbers 18 in Flanders and 24 in Wallonia. Harrison also recorded an answer song to the same tune as "Kansas City", called "Goodbye Kansas City", which was released on a single by Fury Records in 1960.

== The Beatles' version ==
"Kansas City" / "Hey, Hey, Hey, Hey"
- 1964 German single picture sleeve

Song by the Beatles

from the album Beatles for Sale
- Released: December 4, 1964 (UK); June 14, 1965 (US)
- Recorded: October 18, 1964
- Studio: EMI, London
- Genre: Rock and roll
- Length: 2:38
- Label: Parlophone (UK); Capitol (US)
- Songwriters: Jerry Leiber and Mike Stoller, Richard Penniman
- Producer: George Martin

In October 1964, the Beatles recorded Little Richard's "Kansas City" (titled "Kansas City"/"Hey, Hey, Hey, Hey"), a song they began performing in Hamburg during Spring 1961.

=== Background ===
Paul McCartney discovered the track in the first half of 1959 when Little Richard's 1955 medley "Kansas City"/"Hey, Hey, Hey, Hey" was re-released as a 45 in Britain. McCartney revered this particular rendition and was unaware of Wilbert Harrison's version. The Beatles' earliest performance of the song can be dated to the early summer of 1960 with its appearance on a set list McCartney copied to a piece of scrap paper.

During their first professional recording session in June 1961, the Beatles likely recorded the song with Tony Sheridan, though outtakes of this track likely no longer exist. The Beatles made their first appearance on television on August 22, 1962, performing "Some Other Guy" and "Kansas City"/"Hey-Hey-Hey-Hey" at The Cavern Club. The audio is the earliest surviving instance of McCartney's "Little Richard voice", which Beatles historian Mark Lewisohn notes is "impressive", with "the high notes sung loud, strong, melodically and excitingly for two and a half minutes." The song is again heard during their December 1962 performance at the Star-Club in Hamburg, officially released in 1977 as Live! at the Star-Club in Hamburg, Germany; 1962. They recorded the medley for a BBC Light Programme on July 16, 1963, released in 1994 on Live at the BBC. Musicologist and writer Ian MacDonald describes this rendition as "one of the highlights of this generally mediocre collection, featuring a strong McCartney vocal and an attacking Harrison solo."

A month before recording the track in the studio, they performed it during a September 17, 1964 concert at Kansas City Municipal Stadium, a one-time addition to their usual setlist. MacDonald writes, "the reaction it drew ensured its place on the LP."

=== Recording ===
On Sunday, October 18, 1964, during a day off from their 1964 UK Tour, the Beatles recorded a medley of "Kansas City"/"Hey, Hey, Hey, Hey". While rehearsing the song, McCartney found some parts difficult to sing. He later recalled that John Lennon pulled him aside and encouraged him, saying, "Come on man, you can do it better than this, get up there!". Recorded in only two takes, take one was marked "best". Each take includes a different guitar solo from George Harrison, indicating he improvised. Harrison plays his Country Gent guitar and Lennon plays his 1958 Rickenbacker 325 Capri. Producer George Martin overdubbed a piano contribution on his Steinway and Ringo Starr provided the drums. Lewisohn describes the part as "barely discernible on record." Martin and engineers Norman Smith and Tony Clark mixed the track for mono and stereo on October 26.

The track differs from Little Richard's in its simplified walking bass and triplet piano chords, which MacDonald writes, "[imparts] a sassy swing to a performance let down only by its lightweight mono mix." MacDonald concludes that it is "one of the Beatles' best covers."

=== Release ===
The Beatles released the track in the UK on December 4, 1964, on their album Beatles for Sale. Release in the US came the following year on June 14, 1965, on Beatles VI. As part of Capitol Records' "Starline" series, the track was the B-side of "Boys" on an October 1965 single.

The Beatles released take two on the 1995 compilation album Anthology 1, a version MacDonald calls "only slightly less successful". This version does not include Martin's piano overdub. A live version, recorded in Hamburg in December 1962, is included on the 1977 release Live! at the Star-Club in Hamburg, Germany; 1962. Other live versions appear on the albums Live at the BBC and On Air – Live at the BBC Volume 2 and in the film Let It Be. The Beatles appeared on the American television program Shindig! performing the medley live in October 1964.

McCartney released his own recording of "Kansas City" on his 1988 cover album CHOBA B CCCP, though it was only available in the Soviet Union until 1991.

Personnel

- Paul McCartney - vocals, bass guitar, claps
- John Lennon - rhythm guitar, vocals, claps
- George Harrison - lead guitar, vocals, claps
- Ringo Starr - drums, claps
- George Martin - piano

== James Brown version ==
"Kansas City"

Single by James Brown

from the album Live at the Apollo, Volume II
- B-side: "Stone Fox"
- Released: 1967
- Genre: Rhythm and blues
- Length: 2:59
- Label: King
- Songwriter: Jerry Leiber and Mike Stoller
- Producer: James Brown

James Brown charting singles chronology
| "Bring It Up" (1967) | "Kansas City" (1967) | "Think" (1967) |

Audio video
- "Kansas City (Live At The Apollo Theater, 1967)" on YouTube

James Brown recorded a version of "Kansas City" in 1967. The single reached number 21 on the R&B chart and number 55 on the Hot 100 singles chart.. An instrumental version was featured on the 1968 album James Brown Plays Nothing But Soul entitled "Buddy E" and a later, funkier version with many returning musicians appears on the 1975 album Everybody's Doin' the Hustle & Dead on the Double Bump. Brown recorded live performances of the song for his albums Live at the Apollo, Volume II (1968), Say It Live and Loud (1998; recorded 1968) and Live At Home With His Bad Self (2019; recorded 1969), and in his concert films James Brown: Man to Man and Live at the Boston Garden. This was also James Brown's first single to be reissued by Polydor Records.

At Brown's request, singer Marva Whitney performed "Kansas City" at the conclusion of his public funeral in Augusta, Georgia in 2006.

== Recognition and influence ==
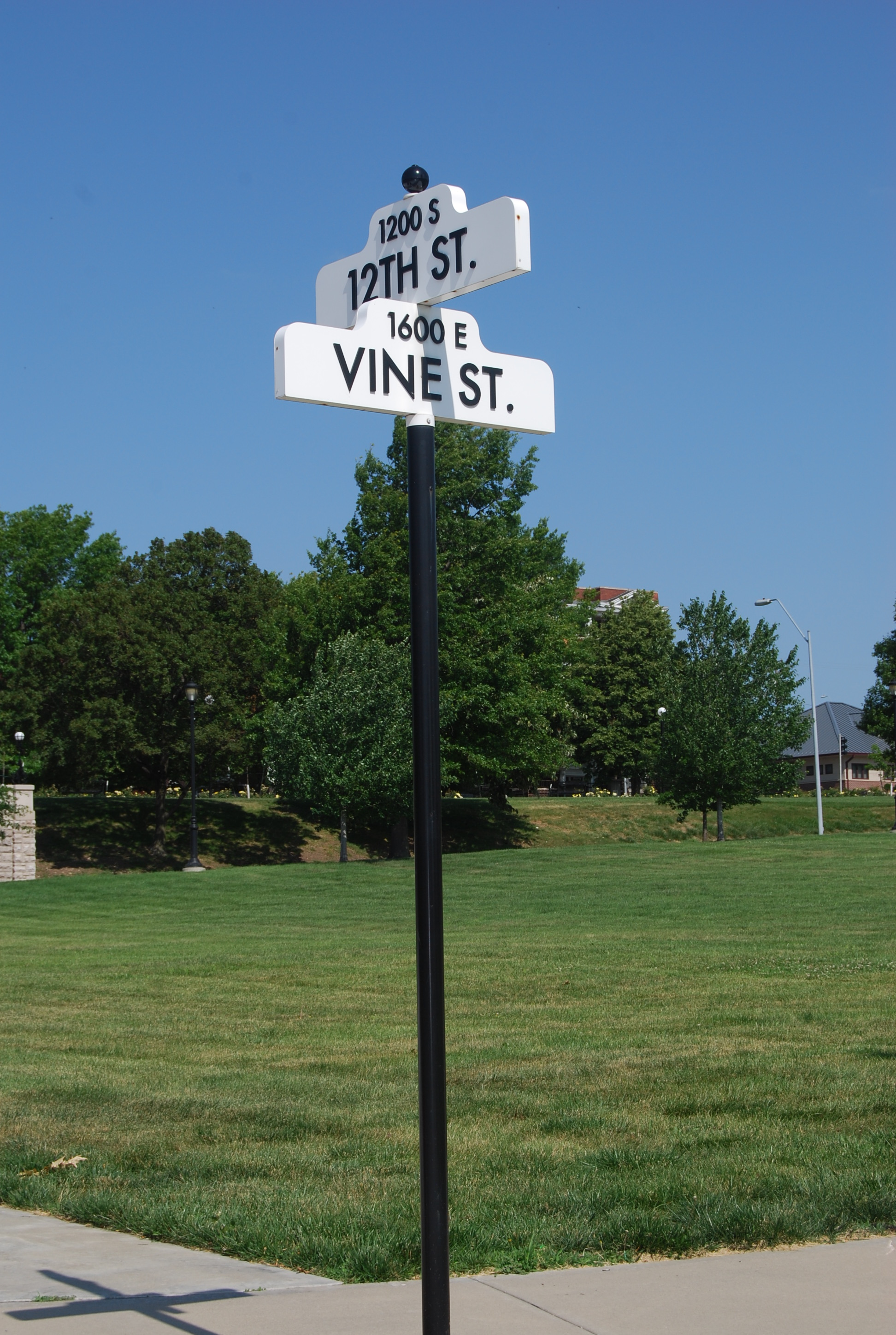
The street signs for 12th Street and Vine in Kansas City

In 2001, Harrison's "Kansas City" received a Grammy Hall of Fame Award and it is included on the Rock and Roll Hall of Fame's list of the "500 Songs That Shaped Rock and Roll". At various times, Harrison's and the Beatles versions have been played over the loud speakers at Kauffman Stadium following Kansas City Royals baseball games.

In 2005, Kansas City adopted "Kansas City" as its official song, dedicating "Goin' to Kansas City Plaza" in the historic 18th and Vine Jazz district. Due to redevelopment, the "12th Street and Vine" intersection mentioned in the song no longer exists, but a park roughly in the shape of a grand piano and with a path in the shape of a treble clef exists at the former location, marked by a commemorative plaque. Some versions have substituted "Eighteenth and Vine" for "12th Street and Vine," which sings just as well, and recognizes Kansas City's jazz history.

In 2026, the Royals second City Connect jersey included the phrase "HEY HEY HEY HEY" inside the collar of the jersey as a nod to the song.

== See also ==
- List of Hot 100 number-one singles of 1959 (U.S.)
- List of number-one R&B singles of 1959 (U.S.)

== Sources ==
- Engelhardt, Kristofer (1998). Beatles Undercover. Burlington: Collector's Guide.
- Everett, Walter (2001). The Beatles As Musicians: The Quarry Men through Rubber Soul. Oxford and New York: Oxford University Press. ISBN 978-0-19-514105-4.
- Kirkman, Paul (2012). Forgotten Tales of Kansas City. Arcadia Publishing. ISBN 978-1-61423-738-9.
- Lewisohn, Mark (1988). The Complete Beatles Recording Sessions. New York: Harmony. ISBN 978-0-517-57066-1.
- Lewisohn, Mark (1992). The Complete Beatles Chronicle:The Definitive Day-By-Day Guide To the Beatles' Entire Career. Chicago: Chicago Review Press. ISBN 978-1-56976-534-0.
- Lewisohn, Mark (2013a). The Beatles – All These Years, Volume One: Tune In. Crown Archetype. ISBN 978-1-4000-8305-3.
- Lewisohn, Mark (2013b). The Beatles – All These Years, Volume One: Tune In (Extended Special ed.). Crown Archetype. ISBN 978-1-4087-0478-3.
- MacDonald, Ian (2005). Revolution in the Head: The Beatles' Records and the Sixties (2nd revised ed.). London: Pimlico. ISBN 978-1-84413-828-9.
