= Lowdown Popcorn =

Single by James Brown

from the album Sex Machine
- B-side: "Top of the Stack"
- Released: 1969
- Recorded: 1969, Miami, FL
- Genre: Funk
- Length: 2:47
- Label: King; 6250
- Songwriter(s): James Brown
- Producer(s): James Brown

James Brown charting singles chronology
"Mother Popcorn (You Got to Have a Mother for Me) Part 1" (1969)	"Lowdown Popcorn" (1969)	"World (Part 1)" (1969)

Audio video
- "Lowdown Popcorn" on YouTube

"Lowdown Popcorn" is a funk instrumental recorded by James Brown. It was the third hit single Brown recorded in 1969 that was inspired by the popular dance the Popcorn, preceded by the instrumental "The Popcorn" and the song "Mother Popcorn". It charted #16 R&B and #41 Pop.

The original studio recording of "Lowdown Popcorn" was included on Brown's 1970 album Sex Machine with added reverb and overdubbed crowd noise to simulate a live performance.
