= Mother Popcorn =

"Mother Popcorn (You Got to Have a Mother for Me) Part 1"

Single by James Brown

from the album It's a Mother
- B-side: "Mother Popcorn (You Got to Have a Mother for Me) Part 2"
- Released: June 1969
- Recorded: May 13, 1969, King Studios, Cincinnati, OH
- Genre: Funk
- Length: 2:55 (Part 1); 3:00 (Part 2)
- Label: King; 6245
- Songwriter(s): James Brown; Alfred Ellis
- Producer(s): James Brown

James Brown charting singles chronology
"The Popcorn" (1969)	"Mother Popcorn (You Got to Have a Mother for Me) Part 1" (1969)	"Lowdown Popcorn" (1969)

Audio video
- "Mother Popcorn (Pt. 1)" on YouTube

"Mother Popcorn (You Got to Have a Mother for Me)" is a song recorded by James Brown and released as a two-part single in 1969. A #1 R&B and #11 Pop hit, it was the highest-charting of a series of recordings inspired by the popular dance the Popcorn which Brown made that year, including "The Popcorn", "Lowdown Popcorn", and "Let a Man Come In and Do the Popcorn". The "mother" of the song's title was, in the words of biographer RJ Smith, "[Brown's] honorific for a big butt".

"Mother Popcorn" has a beat and structure similar to Brown's 1967 hit "Cold Sweat", but a faster tempo and a greater amount of rhythmic activity (including much agitated 16th note movement from the horn section) give it a more frenetic quality than the earlier song. Critic Robert Christgau singled out "Mother Popcorn" as the turning point in Brown's funk music in which he "began to concern himself more and more exclusively with rhythmic distinctions." The song features a saxophone solo by Maceo Parker, which starts at the end of Part 1 in the single version of the song.

Vicki Anderson recorded the answer song "Answer to Mother Popcorn (I Got a Mother for You)", also in 1969.

== Personnel ==
- James Brown - lead vocal

with the James Brown Orchestra:

- Richard "Kush" Griffith - trumpet
- Joe Davis - trumpet
- Fred Wesley - trombone
- Alfred "Pee Wee" Ellis - alto saxophone
- Maceo Parker - tenor saxophone
- St. Clair Pinckney - baritone saxophone
- Jimmy Nolen - guitar
- Alphonso "Country" Kellum - guitar
- Charles Sherrell - bass guitar
- Clyde Stubblefield - drums

A James Brown Production

== Live version ==
Brown performs a live version of "Mother Popcorn" on his album Sex Machine.

== "You Got to Have a Mother for Me" ==
On January 13, 1969 Brown recorded a song at the RCA Studios in Los Angeles, California under the title "You Got to Have a Mother for Me". It had most of the same lyrics as "Mother Popcorn" but a completely different instrumental component, and was rejected for release as a single in favor of the later recording, which retained the earlier song title as a subtitle. The original "You Got to Have a Mother for Me" was first issued on the 1988 James Brown compilation album Motherlode.

== Cover versions ==
Aerosmith covered "Mother Popcorn" during a live set in 1973 that was recorded, and eventually released on their album Live! Bootleg. It was also covered by Frank Black on the 1998 tribute album James Brown Super Bad @ 65, and by The Blues Brothers in a medley with "Do You Love Me" on Made in America.

== Trivia ==
- The lyrics and music from "Mother Popcorn" are briefly quoted in the Prince song "Gett Off".
- The lyrics "you got to have a mother for me" are quoted by Jon Spencer Blues Explosion in their song "Brenda".
