= Live at the Boston Garden: April 5, 1968 =

- Starring: James Brown
- Country of origin: United States
- Original language: English

Production
- Running time: 81 minutes
- Production company: WGBH-TV

Original release
- Network: WGBH-TV
- Release: April 5, 1968

Live at the Boston Garden: April 5, 1968 is a concert film starring James Brown. Recorded at the Boston Garden by WGBH-TV the night after the assassination of Martin Luther King, Jr., it was broadcast live in an effort to quell potential riots in the city. The recording circulated as a bootleg before it was officially released on DVD by Shout! Factory in 2008 as part of the box set I Got the Feelin': James Brown in the '60s. It received a stand-alone release in 2009.

The concert was the subject of the 2008 PBS/VH-1 documentary The Night James Brown Saved Boston, directed by David Leaf and a chapter of Common Ground by J. Anthony Lukas.

== Songs ==
1. "That's Life"
2. "Kansas City"
3. Medley: "It's a Man's Man's Man's World"/"Lost Someone"/"Bewildered"
4. "Get It Together"
5. "There Was a Time"
6. "I Got the Feelin'"
7. "Try Me"
8. Medley: "Cold Sweat"/"Ride the Pony"/"Cold Sweat"
9. "I Got You (I Feel Good)"
10. "Please, Please, Please"
11. "I Can't Stand Myself (When You Touch Me)"

== See also ==
- List of American films of 1968
- James Brown: Man to Man
