= Thinking About Little Willie John and a Few Nice Things =

Studio album by James Brown
- Released: November 1968
- Recorded: June 27, 1968 (side one); August 17, 1967 – October 18, 1968 (side two)
- Studios: Bell Sound Studios (New York City, New York) (side one); King Studios (Cincinnati, Ohio) (side two)
- Genre: Funk
- Length: 37:36
- Labels: King; 1038
- Producer: James Brown

James Brown chronology
James Brown Plays Nothing But Soul (1968)	Thinking About Little Willie John and a Few Nice Things (1968)	A Soulful Christmas (1968)

Professional ratings
Review scores
Source	Rating
AllMusic	4/5 stars
The Rolling Stone Album Guide	3.5/5 stars

Thinking About Little Willie John and a Few Nice Things is the 21st studio album by American musician James Brown. The album was released in November 1968, by King Records.

Early in his career, Brown had opened shows for Little Willie John, a prominent R&B singer from the mid-1950s to the 1960s perhaps most well-known for the song "Fever". Brown recorded Thinking About Little Willie John and a Few Nice Things a little more than a half-year after John's death. Side One of the album consists of cover versions of Little Willie John songs. Side Two is all instrumentals.

== Track listing ==
No.	Title	Writer(s)	Length
1.	"Talk to Me, Talk to Me"	Joe Seneca	3:28
2.	"Suffering With the Blues"	Lloyd Pemberton, Teddy Conyers	3:06
3.	"Cottage for Sale" (featuring Members of The Dapps & New York Studio Orchestra)	Larry Conley, Willard Robison	3:29
4.	"Bill Bailey"	Hughie Cannon	2:44
5.	"Home at Last"	Rudy Toombs	4:49
6.	"Heart Break (It's Hurtin' Me)"	Jon Thomas, Carlee Hoyle	3:05
7.	"What Kind of Man"	James Brown, Bud Hobgood, Eddie Setser, Troy Seals	2:06
8.	"A Note Or Two, Pt. I"	James Brown, Bud Hobgood	3:08
9.	"I'll Lose My Mind"	James Brown, Bud Hobgood, Bobby Byrd	3:12
10.	"Fat Eddie"	James Brown, Bud Hobgood, Ron Lenhoff	2:37
11.	"You Gave My Heart a Song to Sing"	James Brown, Bud Hobgood, Bobby Byrd	2:48
12.	"A Note Or Two, Pt. II"	James Brown, Bud Hobgood	3:01

== Personnel (side one) ==
- James Brown – lead vocals
- Johnny Grimes – trumpet
- Waymon Reed – trumpet
- Les Asch – tenor saxophone
- David Parkinson – alto saxophone, baritone saxophone
- Alfred "Pee Wee" Ellis – organ
- Wally Richardson – guitar
- Al Lucas – bass
- Bernard Purdie – drums
