= Pete "Guitar" Lewis =

Pete "Guitar" Lewis (probably July 11, 1913 – September 25, 1970) was an American rhythm and blues guitarist and occasional harmonica player, best known as a session musician and performer with Johnny Otis in the late 1940s and 1950s.

== Biography ==
Though details of his life are uncertain, researchers Bob Eagle and Eric LeBlanc state that he was born Carl Lewis in Oklahoma City. Influenced in his guitar playing by T-Bone Walker, he was discovered by Johnny Otis performing in an amateur hour event at the Barrelhouse Club in Los Angeles in 1947. He was recruited to Otis' band, and performed and recorded with him until about 1956. One reviewer says of Lewis:

[He] took the electric guitar to new heights, offering sophisticated turns of phrase that bordered on jazz-inflected, to low-down gut bucket riffs that were unceremoniously wrenched out of his instrument — sometimes, all in the same song, or if need be, in the short space of a twelve-bar solo. His playing is at once, crisp, precise, and gritty — not to mention endlessly inventive — the perfect complement to Otis' rocking big band.

His guitar features prominently on such tracks as "Boogie Guitar" and "Good Old Blues", on which Lewis plays licks later adopted by Chuck Berry, and also recorded with saxophonist Ben Webster in Otis' band in 1951. Lewis recorded as a session musician for Don Robey's Duke and Peacock labels, backing such musicians as Johnny Ace, Little Esther Phillips, and Big Mama Thornton on her original 1952 recording of "Hound Dog". Songwriters Leiber and Stoller stated that the original arrangement of "Hound Dog" was based on a riff that Lewis developed in the recording studio. He also recorded several tracks under his own name for Federal Records in 1952, and for Peacock the following year.

Lewis left Otis' band in 1956 after an argument, perhaps related to Lewis' alcoholism. He was replaced in the band by Jimmy Nolen. Lewis' only later recording was accompanying singer Willie Egan. He is believed to have still been performing in Los Angeles nightclubs in the early 1960s. However, Otis reported that, by the mid-1960s, Lewis had been reduced to homelessness. He is believed to have died in Los Angeles in 1970.
