= Copyright Criminals =

- Directed by: Benjamin Franzen
- Written by: Kembrew McLeod (book)
- Produced by: Benjamin Franzen (producer); Kembrew McLeod (executive producer)
- Cinematography: Benjamin Franzen
- Edited by: Benjamin Franzen
- Release dates: September 19, 2009 (Toronto International Film Festival); January 18, 2010 (United States)
- Running time: 54 minutes
- Country: United States
- Language: English

Copyright Criminals is a 2009 documentary film directed and produced by Benjamin Franzen examining the creative and the commercial value of sampling including the related debates over artistic expression, copyright law, and money.

Copyright Criminals was funded by the Ford Foundation, University of Iowa and John D. and Catherine T. MacArthur Foundation. It premiered in 2009 at the Toronto International Film Festival. It was broadcast nationally in the United States on 18 January 2010 on Public Broadcasting Service (PBS) on the documentary series Independent Lens.

Sampling is when musicians make an audio montage taking a portion, or sample, of a sound recording and reusing, remixing or reworking it as a separate instrumental layer or loop into another song. It is popular with hip hop musicians. The documentary contains interviews with several sampling artist pioneers, including hip-hop groups. A longtime area of contention from a legal perspective, early sampling used portions of other artists' recordings without permission. Once hip-hop, rap and other music incorporating sampling began generating a noticeably substantial income, the original artists began to take legal action, claiming copyright infringement and demanding high-sum royalties. Sampling artists fought back, claiming fair use.

The documentary took five years to finish (2004–2009). It is the debut film for Franzen, a graduate of University of Iowa and founder of Atlanta-based production company Changing Images, and Kembrew McLeod, a professor specializing in copyright law at University of Iowa.

== Featured artists ==
Artists that appear in the documentary:

- Aesop Rock
- Shock G
- Bobbito García
- Chuck D
- Clyde Stubblefield
- De La Soul
- DJ Pam the Funkstress of The Coup
- DJ Qbert
- Paul D. Miller aka DJ Spooky, That Subliminal Kid
- Eclectic Method
- El-P
- Eyedea & Abilities
- George Clinton
- Hank Shocklee of The Bomb Squad
- Harry Allen
- Liquid Liquid
- Mark Hosler
- Matt Black
- Miho Hatori
- Mix Master Mike
- Mr. Len
- Pete Rock
- Scott Herren (credited as Prefuse 73)
- Sage Francis
- Saul Williams
- Steve Albini

== See also ==
- RiP!: A Remix Manifesto, a 2008 documentary film on the same topic
