= I Got the Feelin' =

- The I Got the Feelin' album

Single by James Brown

from the album I Got the Feelin'
- B-side: "If I Ruled the World"
- Released: January 1968
- Recorded: 1967, Vox Studios, Los Angeles
- Genre: Funk
- Length: 2:40
- Label: King; 6155
- Songwriter: James Brown
- Producer: James Brown

James Brown charting singles chronology
"You've Got to Change Your Mind" (1968)	"I Got the Feelin'" (1968)	"Licking Stick – Licking Stick (Part 1)" (1968)

Audio video
- "I Got The Feelin'" on YouTube

"I Got the Feelin'" is a funk song by James Brown. Released as a single in 1968, it reached No. 1 on the R&B chart and #6 on the pop chart. It also appeared on a 1968 album of the same name.

The Jackson 5 auditioned for Motown founder Berry Gordy in 1968 with a filmed performance of "I Got the Feelin'", with the ten-year-old Michael Jackson closely mimicking Brown's vocal style and dance moves.

In 1986, the song was prominently featured in the third-season episode of The Cosby Show entitled "Golden Anniversary", with most of the cast performing a lip-synch routine led by a 16-year-old Malcolm-Jamal Warner.

A version of the song is featured in the musical Fela!

The song has been featured in the films Another 48 Hrs. (1990), Dead Presidents (1995), and Undercover Brother (2002).

== Personnel ==
- James Brown — lead vocal

with the James Brown Orchestra:

- Waymon Reed - trumpet
- Joe Dupars — trumpet
- Levi Rasbury — trombone
- Alfred "Pee Wee" Ellis — alto saxophone
- Maceo Parker — tenor saxophone
- St. Clair Pinckney — baritone saxophone
- Jimmy Nolen — guitar
- Alphonso "Country" Kellum — guitar
- Bernard Odum — bass
- Clyde Stubblefield — drums
