= Eclectic Method =

Eclectic Method is the name of an audio-visual remix act, originally formed in London in 2001 by Jonny Wilson. Geoff Gamlen and Ian Edgar. Wilson is the sole remaining member.

== History ==
Inspired almost entirely by Jonny's early experiences with Sony Vegas editing software, Eclectic Method's audiovisual style quickly developed into a live performance featuring video turntables (Pioneer DVJ-1000) - mixing videos, often acapellas, as integral parts of their astounding audio mashups. As a live act, they have travelled around the world playing hundreds of gigs in Asia, North America, South America, Europe and the Middle East.

After the early period in which EM's output was considered bootleg and unofficial, video remixes Eclectic Method were called upon by artists including Fatboy Slim and U2 and by film, video, and television companies such as New Line Cinema and Palm Pictures.

Eclectic Method appeared in the 2009 film Copyright Criminals.

Eclectic Method (Johnny Wilson) opened the Dance Forest stage at the Virgin Mobile FreeFest in Columbia, Maryland on September 10, 2011.

2013 saw EM at Comicon representing the BBC with a Doctor Who mix, and working with Snoop Lion.

== Members ==
- Johnny Wilson

=== Former members ===
- Geoff Gamlen (left the group in 2012 to pursue his own musical path)
- Ian Edgar (since 2011, no longer part of the group)

== Videography ==
- Bootleg Video Mix CD-ROM (2002)
- MTV MASH (MTV Europe) (2003–2004)
- Santa Claus Conquers The Martians (Mixmasters ITV) (2003)
- Snake Worship Island (Audiovisualize DVD) (2004)
- We're Not Vjs DVD (2005)
- XL Recordings Video Megamix (2005)
- Fatboy Slim Video Megamix (2006)
- Take The Lead Remix (New Line Cinema) (2006)
- Freestyle Vs Scratch Movie Mashup Mix (Palm Pictures) (2006)
- U2 Remix (Vertigo & ZooTV) (2007)
- Faithless - I Won't Stop AV Remix (2007)
- The Tarantino Mixtape (2009)
- Eclectic Method Goes Phish (2009)
- The Colbert / Lawrence Lessig Remix (2009)
- The Wu Tang Mixtape (2010)
- robots (2011)
- The Apocamix (2011)
- Zombies (2012)
- Lasers (2012)
- The Dark Side (2012)
- 99 Problems in Film (2012)
- The Billy Murray Mix (2012)
- Fight Dub (2012)
- Monsters (2013)
