= Alan Leeds =

American music executive (born 1947)

- Born: January 26, 1947 (age 79); Jackson Heights, New York, U.S.
- Occupations: Music executive, tour manager, production manager, writer, archivist
- Spouse: Gwen
- Children: Tristan
- Relatives: Eric Leeds (brother)
- Awards: Grammy Award for Best Album Notes (1992)

Alan Leeds (born January 26, 1947) is an American music executive, tour manager, production manager, writer and archivist best known for his work organizing performances and concert tours for artists such as James Brown, Prince, KISS, Cameo, D'Angelo and Chris Rock. In addition to his career in management for artists, Leeds is recognized as an award-winning writer and music archivist. Leeds received a Grammy Award for Best Album Notes in 1992 for his work on the James Brown compilation Star Time. Leeds also penned the liner notes for the 1993 Prince box set The Hits/The B-Sides, and cowrote The James Brown Reader with Nelson George.

Alan Leeds was born in Jackson Heights, New York.

Leeds' music career began as a music writer. He first became involved with James Brown as his publicity director in 1969, and worked as Brown's tour manager from 1970 to 1973. Beginning in 1983, Leeds managed tours for Prince during the peak of his commercial and artistic success, notably including the Purple Rain Tour. Leeds' work with Prince culminated in his eventual naming as president of Prince's label Paisley Park Records in 1989.

Leeds' career as a tour manager continued with D'Angelo, managing the successful Voodoo Tour in 2000. This was followed by stints with a variety of other artists, including Raphael Saadiq and The Roots. Leeds has also been involved in the curation of the James Brown: The Singles collections, and has spoken at events commemorating Brown's career and accomplishments.

== Personal life ==
Alan Leeds has a wife, Gwen, and a son, Tristan. His brother is saxophonist Eric Leeds.

In 2020, Leeds released the biographical book, "There Was a Time: James Brown, The Chitlin' Circuit, and Me."
