= Clyde Stubblefield =

American drummer (1943–2017)

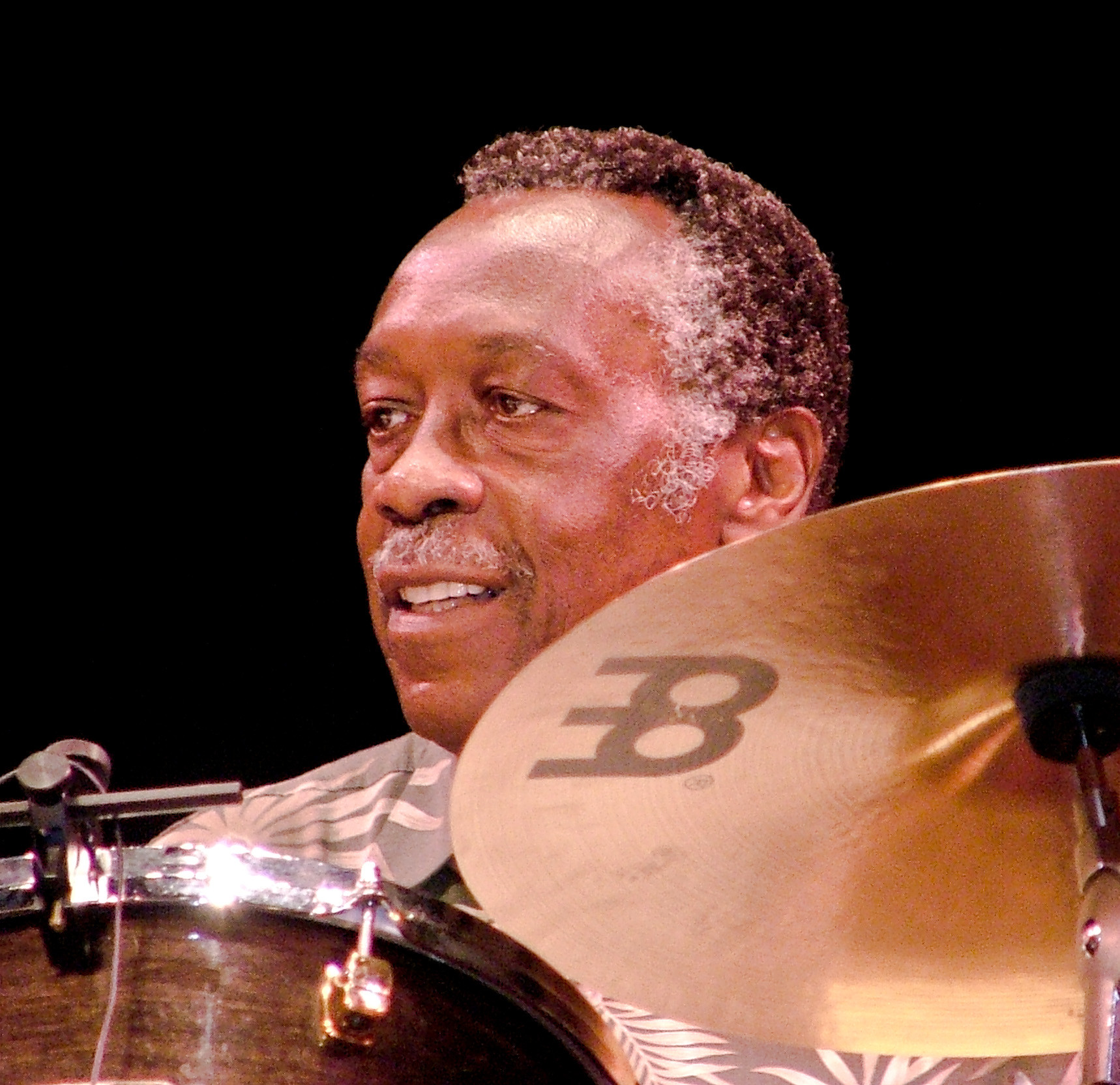
- Stubblefield performing in 2005

Background information
- Born: Clyde Austin Stubblefield; April 18, 1943; Chattanooga, Tennessee, U.S.
- Died: February 18, 2017 (aged 73) Madison, Wisconsin, U.S.
- Genres: Funk; R&B; soul
- Occupation: Musician
- Instrument: Drums
- Years active: c. 1960–2017

Clyde Austin Stubblefield (April 18, 1943 – February 18, 2017) was an American drummer best known for his work with James Brown, with whom he recorded and toured for six years (1965-70). His syncopated drum patterns on Brown's recordings are considered funk standards. Samples of his drum performances (particularly his break in the 1970 track "Funky Drummer") were heavily used in hip hop music beginning in the 1980s, although Stubblefield frequently received no credit.

A self-taught musician, Stubblefield was influenced by the sound of industrial rhythms he heard in factories and trains. He began playing with local groups in his native Tennessee and later moved to Georgia, where he played with musicians such as Eddie Kirkland and Otis Redding in the early 1960s before joining Brown's band. He later settled in Madison, Wisconsin, where he was a staple of the local music scene. He has been named among the greatest drummers of all time by various publications. Rolling Stone placed him tied with his bandmate Jabo Starks at number 6 on their list of "100 Greatest Drummers of All Time". In 2017, he accepted an honorary degree from the University of Wisconsin–Madison.

== Early life ==
Clyde Austin Stubblefield was born on April 18, 1943, in Chattanooga, Tennessee, to Frank D. and Vena Stubblefield. He was inspired to pursue drumming after seeing drummers for the first time in a parade. As a youngster his sense of rhythm was influenced by the industrial sounds of factories and trains around him. He practiced the rhythm patterns that he heard, sometimes playing two patterns simultaneously. Years later he said if he could hum a drum pattern, he could play it. He played professionally as a teenager and performed in local bands such as Blue Shufflers, Inclines, and Cascades. In the early 1960s he moved to Macon, Georgia, and worked with guitarist Eddie Kirkland and toured with Otis Redding.

== Drummer for James Brown, 1965 to 1970 ==
In 1965, James Brown saw Stubblefield perform in Macon, Georgia, and asked him to audition. Soon after he joined Brown's band. Over the next six years the band had two drummers, Stubblefield and John "Jabo" Starks who had joined the band two weeks earlier. Starks' style was influenced by the church music he grew up with in Mobile, Alabama. The two drummers had no formal training. According to Stubblefield, "We just played what we wanted to play (...) We just put down what we think it should be." The two "created the grooves on many of Brown's biggest hits and laid the foundation for modern funk drumming in the process."

Stubblefield's recordings with James Brown are considered to be some of the standard-bearers for funk drumming, including the singles "Cold Sweat", "I Got the Feelin'", "Give It Up or Turnit a Loose", "Say It Loud – I'm Black and I'm Proud", "Mother Popcorn", "Get Up, Get into It, Get Involved", "There Was a Time", "Ain't It Funky Now", and the album Sex Machine.

His rhythm pattern on James Brown's "Funky Drummer" is among the world's most sampled musical segments. It has been used for decades by hip-hop groups and rappers such as Public Enemy, Run-DMC, N.W.A, Raekwon, LL Cool J, Beastie Boys and Prince, and has also been used in other genres. Though the sole creator of his patterns, Stubblefield was not credited for the use of the samples. He was featured in the 2009 PBS documentary, Copyright Criminals, which addressed the creative and legal aspects of sampling in the music industry.

External videos
- Drum solo, Boston Garden 1968, "Cold Sweat"

== Career, 1971 to 2017 ==
Stubblefield lived in Madison, Wisconsin, from 1971 onward. For over twenty years he played Monday nights with his band, The Clyde Stubblefield Band, in downtown Madison. The band featured his longtime friend and keyboard-organ player Steve "Doc" Skaggs, along with soul vocalists Charlie Brooks and Karri Daley, as well as a horn section and supporting band. Stubblefield retired from the Monday shows in 2011 due to health issues, leaving the band in the hands of his nephew Bret Stubblefield.

Stubblefield worked with a variety of musicians in the Madison area such as keyboardist Steve Skaggs, guitarists Luther Allison and Cris Plata, jazz violinist Randy Sabien, rock band Garbage, country trio Common Faces and jazz group NEO. He performed and recorded with members of The J.B.'s including Bootsy Collins, Maceo Parker and "Jabo" Starks. The group released the album Bring the Funk on Down in 1999. From the early 1990s to 2015, he performed on the nationally syndicated public radio show Whad'Ya Know?

Stubblefield's first solo album The Revenge of the Funky Drummer was released in 1997. The album was produced by producer-songwriter Richard Mazda. In 1998, he released a 26 track break-beat album titled The Original Funky Drummer Breakbeat Album. Stubblefield's third solo album The Original was released in 2003. All compositions were based on Stubblefield's drum grooves and the album was produced by Leo Sidran.

Stubblefield collaborated frequently with "Jabo" Starks. As the Funkmasters, the duo released an album in 2001 called Find the Groove and an album in 2006 called Come Get Summa This. The duo also released a drumming instruction video in 1999 titled Soul of the Funky Drummers. In December 2007, the duo joined Bootsy Collins in Covington, Kentucky, for the first tribute concert in memory of James Brown. Stubblefield and Starks played on Funk for Your Ass, a tribute album by fellow James Brown orchestra alum Fred Wesley. The album was released in 2008. Later that year an expansion to the EZdrummer software was released with samples recorded by Stubblefield and Starks.

In 2009, Stubblefield was in need of a kidney transplant and underwent dialysis treatments. Musicians in the Madison area organized fundraiser events, donating the proceeds to supplement his dialysis treatment and subsequent medical bills. Stubblefield coped with health issues from the early 2000s onward including cancer. His wife Jody Hannon was a source of support in managing his health.

In 2011, Stubblefield performed "Fight the Power" on the Jimmy Fallon show along with Chuck D and members of The Roots and Eclectic Method. In 2012, he gave an autobiographical talk and performed his favorite beats at the Madison Ruby conference in Madison, Wisconsin. In 2015, a scholarship fund for music education was started and named after Stubblefield.

== Recognition ==
In 2014, Stubblefield was named the second best drummer of all time by LA Weekly. According to the LA Weekly, "Stubblefield is one of the most sampled drummers in history, the man whose uncanny ability to deconstruct pop music's simple 4/4 rhythms into a thousand different sly syncopations laid the foundation not only for funk, but for most of hip-hop, as well." In 2013, Stubblefield and Starks received the Yamaha Legacy Award. In 2004, he received the lifetime achievement award at the Madison Area Music Awards. In 2000, he was inducted into the Wisconsin Area Music Industry hall of fame. In 1990 he was named drummer of the year by Rolling Stone magazine, and in 2016 the magazine named Stubblefield and Starks the sixth best drummer of all time. A set of Stubblefield's autographed drum-sticks are in the Rock and Roll Hall of Fame.

Drummer David Garibaldi credits Stubblefield for inventing the vocabulary of funk drumming. Garibaldi singles out the drumming on "I Got the Feelin'" as the "sign of a genius". According to Questlove, drummer of The Roots, Stubblefield is the one "who defined funk music." Chuck D said of Stubblefield's impact on hip-hop, "It was a style of repetition that was emulated as opposed to just the actual sound. You know, holding it there, and keeping steady with the vamp." Nerdcore rapper MC Frontalot paid tribute to Stubblefield in his song "Good Old Clyde". Hip hop artist Black Thought of The Roots rhymes "I'm cooler than Clyde Stubblefield, drummer for James" in the song "Stay Cool".

Ben Sisario of The New York Times writes: "On songs like 'Cold Sweat' and 'Mother Popcorn' [Stubblefield] perfected a light-touch style filled with the off-kilter syncopations sometimes called ghost notes." According to National Public Radio, "the grooves [Stubblefield and Starks] created have inspired generations of artists — not just in funk, but in hip-hop, where their steady but intricate patterns make natural material for sampling." In 2017, Stubblefield accepted an honorary doctorate of fine arts from the University of Wisconsin–Madison, which was conferred posthumously.

== Death ==
Stubblefield died on February 18, 2017, from kidney failure. He survived cancer in 2000 and coped with kidney disease since 2002. In 2016, it was reported pop icon Prince, who deeply admired Stubblefield, paid about $80,000 of the drummer's medical costs. Stubblefield was survived by his wife Jody Hannon.

== Quotations ==
In a 1991 interview with Isthmus, Stubblefield said: "What influenced me mainly was sounds. Train tracks. Washing machines. I just put patterns against natural sounds, and that's what I do today. I could be walking down the street in time and put a drum pattern against it while I'm walking (...) That's the same thing I'm doing now when I sit down behind the drums. I put a pattern behind what everyone else is doing."

== Discography ==
Credits adapted from AllMusic, except as noted.

=== As leader ===
- The Revenge of the Funky Drummer (1997)
- The Original Funky Drummer Breakbeat Album (1998)
- The Original (2003)

=== As co-leader ===
- Find the Groove (2001)
- Come Get Summa This (2006)

=== As sideman ===
With Fred Wesley

- Funk for Your Ass (2008)

With James Brown selected works

- Cold Sweat (1967)
- I Got the Feelin' (1968)
- It's a Mother (1969)
- Say It Loud – I'm Black and I'm Proud (1969)
- Sex Machine (1970)

With The J.B.'s

- Bring the Funk on Down (1999)

With Ben Sidran

- Puttin' in Time on Planet Earth (Blue Thumb, 1973)
- Don't Let Go (Blue Thumb, 1974)

With Garbage

- Garbage (1995)

== Instructional videos ==
- Soul of the Funky Drummers (1999)
