= There Was a Time =

Single by James Brown

from the album I Can't Stand Myself When You Touch Me
- A-side: "I Can't Stand Myself (When You Touch Me)"
- B-side: "I Feel All Right (maxisingle)"
- Released: November 1967
- Recorded: June 24–25, 1967, Apollo Theater, New York, NY
- Genre: Funk
- Length: 3:35
- Label: King; 6144
- Songwriters: James Brown; Bud Hobgood
- Producer: James Brown

James Brown charting singles chronology
"I Can't Stand Myself (When You Touch Me)" (1967)	"There Was a Time" (1967)	"You've Got to Change Your Mind" (1968)

Audio video
- "There Was A Time" on YouTube

"There Was a Time" is a song written and performed by James Brown.

== Release history ==
"There Was a Time" was recorded in June 1967 during a live performance at the Apollo Theater in a medley with "Let Yourself Go" and "I Feel All Right", and was first released November 1967 in edited form as the B-side of the single "I Can't Stand Myself (When You Touch Me)". The song charted #3 R&B — higher than the A-side — and #36 Pop. This edit of the song also appeared on the 1968 album I Can't Stand Myself When You Touch Me. A 14-minute-long edit of the Apollo medley was issued on Brown's 1968 album Live at the Apollo, Volume II. Though it was nominally only one song in the medley, "There Was a Time" became the colloquial name for the entire sequence. The complete medley was finally issued on the Deluxe Edition of Live at the Apollo, Volume II, released in 2001. The medley was also edited into two tracks which began the B-side of the 1969 King album It's a Mother retitled "The Little Groove Maker Me."

== Chart performance ==
Chart (1967–68)	Peak position
US Billboard Hot 100	36
US Best Selling R&B Singles (Billboard)	3

== Other recordings ==
Brown made additional recordings of "There Was a Time" with the acoustic jazz combo the Dee Felice Trio for his 1969 album Gettin' Down to It, and with the Louie Bellson big band for 1970's Soul on Top, in a performance cut from the original LP release but restored for its 2004 CD reissue. A live performance from 1969 appears on the 1970 album Sex Machine. Another live recording of "There Was a Time", from an August 1968 concert in Dallas, Texas, was first issued on the 1991 Star Time box set, then remastered for the 1998 release Say It Live and Loud: Live in Dallas 08.26.68. Brown also performs the song in the concert films James Brown: Man to Man and Live at the Boston Garden: April 5, 1968.

An instrumental version of "There Was a Time" with saxophonist Alfred "Pee Wee" Ellis was released in 1968. It was an overdubbed version of the tune credited to The Dapps.

== Cover versions ==
"There Was a Time" was part of The Jackson 5's repertoire beginning early in their career. They perform it in concert on the album Live at the Forum. In a famous incident, Michael Jackson and Prince performed the song while sharing the stage with Brown and his band at Los Angeles' Beverly Theater in 1983.

Other artists who have recorded the song include Gene Chandler, Eddie Harris, and The Blue Sky Boys.
