= I Can't Stand Myself (When You Touch Me) =

Single by James Brown

from the album I Can't Stand Myself When You Touch Me
- A-side: "Pt. 1"
- B-side: "There Was a Time"
- Released: December 1967
- Recorded: October 30, 1967, King Studios, Cincinnati, OH
- Genre: Soul, funk
- Length: 3:25 (Pt. 1/single version); 3:50 (Pt. 2); 7:20 (full version)
- Label: King; 6144
- Songwriter: James Brown
- Producer: James Brown

James Brown charting singles chronology
"Get It Together (Part 1)" (1967)	"I Can't Stand Myself (When You Touch Me)" (1967)	""There Was a Time" (B-side of "I Can't Stand Myself (When You Touch Me)")" (1967)

Audio video
- "I Can't Stand Myself (When You Touch Me)" on YouTube

"I Can't Stand Myself (When You Touch Me)", also known as "I Can't Stand It", is a song written and recorded by James Brown in 1967. It is the most successful of the handful of recordings he made with The Dapps, a band of white musicians led by Beau Dollar. The single release of the song, which was sped up shifting the pitch up a half step/key, rose to #4 on the Billboard R&B chart and #28 on the Pop chart. The single's B-side, "There Was a Time", also charted.

"I Can't Stand Myself (When You Touch Me)" was included on the 1968 album I Can't Stand Myself When You Touch Me, where it was labeled "Pt. 1". A "Pt. 2", which appeared later in the album, never received a single release.

== Musicians ==
- James Brown - lead vocal
- Tim Hedding - organ
- "Fat Eddie" Setser - guitar
- Tim Drummond - bass
- William "Beau Dollar" Bowman - drums

== Chart performance ==
Chart (1967–68)	Peak position
US Billboard Hot 100	28
US Best Selling R&B Singles (Billboard)	4

== Other versions ==
Brown re-recorded "I Can't Stand Myself (When You Touch Me)" 4 times: in 1971 for Hot Pants under the title "Can't Stand It", in 1974 for the album Hell under the title "I Can't Stand It '76'", in 1976 for Get Up Offa That Thing under the title "This Feeling" and with synthesizers in 1998 for the album I'm Back. A live version of the song is included on the 1998 album Say It Live and Loud: Live in Dallas 08.26.68.

James Chance and the Contortions covered the song on the 1978 no wave compilation album No New York.
