= Bernard Odum =

Background information
- Born: Bertrand Odom; June 10, 1932; Greenville, Alabama, U.S.
- Died: August 17, 2004 (aged 72) Mobile, Alabama, U.S.
- Genres: R&B; funk
- Occupation: Musician
- Instrument: Bass
- Formerly of: The J.B.'s; Maceo & All the King's Men

Bertrand Odom (June 10, 1932 – August 17, 2004), known professionally as Bernard Odum, was an American bass guitar player best known for performing in James Brown's band in the 1960s.

== Biography ==
Odum started playing with Brown in 1956 and became a full-time member of Brown's band in 1958. He worked in the James Brown band until the end of the 1960s, and played on such hits as "Papa's Got A Brand New Bag" (1965), "I Got You (I Feel Good)" (1965), and "Cold Sweat" (1967).

In 1969, Odum and most of the other musicians in Brown's band walked out on him over a pay dispute and other issues, prompting Brown to create a new backing band, The J.B.'s. In 1970, Odum briefly joined Maceo Parker's group, Maceo & All the King's Men, appearing on the album Doin' Their Own Thing.

Bernard Odum played a 1956 Fender Precision Bass, strung with flatwound strings, throughout most of his career. He also played a Vox "teardrop" bass as well as a 120 watt Westminster 1x18 bass combo amp when Brown and his band gained an endorsement from Vox towards the end of 1965.

Odum died of kidney failure at the age of 72 in his hometown of Mobile, Alabama.
