= Beau Dollar =

American drummer (1941–2011)

- Born: William Hargis Bowman; April 21, 1941; Hamilton, Ohio, U.S.
- Died: February 22, 2011 (aged 69); Cincinnati, Ohio, U.S.
- Genres: Rock 'n' roll R&B; Soul
- Occupations: Singer-songwriter, musician
- Instrument: Vocals
- Years active: 1965–2011
- Label: King
- Formerly of: The Dapps; Beau Dollar & The Coins, Lonnie Mack

William Hargis Bowman Jr. (April 21, 1941 – February 22, 2011), better known by his stage name Beau Dollar, was an American soul vocalist and drummer for King Records. He performed on many studio albums for various artists under contract with King, including James Brown. His most prominent work was performed as "Beau Dollar & The Dapps" and "Beau Dollar & The Coins".

== Career ==
Beau Dollar & The Dapps were formed in Cincinnati in 1965, where they often played the famous Living Room nightclub. The band consisted of Bowman, Eddie Setser, Charles Summers, Tim Heding, Ron Geisman, Les Asch, and David Parkinson. The band found success after being discovered by James Brown the same year they were formed. Under Brown's direction, the band produced their first single, "It's A Gas". However, Brown's long-running dispute with King caused the single to be shelved. At the same time, the band also worked with Hank Ballard, who had left The Midnighters in search of solo success. In 1967, they released two singles, "Bringing Up The Guitar" and "There Was a Time". The single "There Was a Time", with "The Rabbit Got the Gun" on the B-side, featured saxophonist Alfred Ellis and it "bubbled under" the Billboard Hot 100, peaking at No. 103 in 1968.

The Dapps eventually broke up in 1969. Brown replaced the band with The Pacesetters, who eventually became The J.B.'s.

Beau Dollar & The Coins had some success with "Soul Serenade" in 1966 (a cover of the King Curtis 1964 single).

Beau Dollar's only solo credited song was "Who Knows" (which is believed to have been backed by The Dapps) in 1970. Beau Dollar also played with Lonnie Mack in the early 1960s.

Beau Dollar died on February 22, 2011, at age 69.
