= Jimmy Nolen =

American guitarist (1934–1983)

Jimmy Nolen (April 3, 1934 – December 18, 1983) was an American guitarist, known for his distinctive "chicken scratch" lead guitar playing in James Brown's bands. In its survey of "The 100 Greatest Guitarists of All Time," the English magazine Mojo ranks Nolen number 12. Rolling Stone named Nolen the 12th greatest guitarist of all time in 2023.

== Career ==
=== Early life and career ===
Born in Oklahoma City, Oklahoma, United States, Nolen took up the guitar at the age of 14, teaching himself on a Harmony Acoustic guitar. Having played the violin since the age of nine, Nolen already had a sound musical foundation upon which to base his T-Bone Walker-inspired guitar playing. Nolen was "discovered" in a club in Tulsa, Oklahoma by Jimmy Wilson, a blues singer famous for his 1953 hit "Tin Pan Alley." Soon afterward, Wilson offered Nolen a job in his band. He took Nolen back to Los Angeles, California, to play in a studio band with popular southern California players Monte Easter (trumpet) and Chuck Higgins (tenor saxophone). During this period Nolen recorded his own commercially unsuccessful singles, mostly for King Records' Federal subsidiary, on which he both sang and played period-inspired blues songs.

In 1957, Nolen began to play for Johnny Otis, replacing the ailing Pete "Guitar" Lewis. He was the principal behind Otis' hit "Willie and the Hand Jive." He remained in Otis’ band until 1959 when he formed his own group, The Jimmy Nolen Band. They performed in small clubs and ballrooms in California and Arizona's "Chitlin' Circuit", backing many of the blues musicians that passed through California. The principal influences that inspired his guitar technique were, T-Bone Walker, B.B. King and Lowell Fulson. The Jimmy Nolen band was popular but never released any records since their primary purpose was to work as live backup for more famous acts. In the early 1960s Nolen began playing with the backing band for harmonica player George "Harmonica" Smith.

=== James Brown (1965–1970, 1972–1983) ===
In 1965, Nolen joined the James Brown band at the recommendation of Les Buie, Brown's guitar player at that time. Buie had grown tired of the road and recommended Nolen as a replacement when the band was in Los Angeles. Like saxophone player Maceo Parker, trombonist Fred Wesley and drummers Clyde Stubblefield and John "Jabo" Starks, Nolen was a staple in James Brown's band.

=== The J.B.'s/Maceo and All the King's Men era (1970–1972) ===
During this time Nolen began to tour with Maceo Parker's group Maceo & All the King's Men. James replied to the mass resignation of his musicians by hiring a then-juvenile band called the Pacemakers from Cincinnati, Ohio. This band was composed of the young Bootsy Collins on bass, his brother Catfish Collins on guitar, Robert McCullough on saxophone, Clayton Gunnels on trumpet, and Frank Waddy on drums. The new band was named The J.B.'s and marked a new era for James Brown. Months after this new band was formed Starks and Stubblefield returned. Despite this band's undeniable talent for playing breakneck funk, it was relatively short-lived as a group, as the Collins brothers soon left to join George Clinton's Parliament-Funkadelic organization. In 1972, Nolen returned to play with The J.B.'s.

=== Death ===
Nolen remained with Brown until December 18, 1983, when he died of a heart attack in Atlanta, Georgia.

== "Chicken scratch" sound ==
Nolen developed a style of picking known as "chicken scratch," in which the guitar strings are pressed lightly against the fingerboard and then quickly released just enough to get a muted "scratching" sound that is produced by rapid rhythmic strumming of the opposite hand near the bridge. Early examples of his work were later featured on the compilation album Scratchin', released by UK Charly Records in 1991 alongside tracks by Pete 'Guitar' Lewis and Cal Green. This new guitar style was affected not only by Nolen's choice of two and three note chord voicings of augmented 7th and 9th chords, but also by his strumming straight 16th note patterns, as in James Brown's "Papa's Got a Brand New Bag." Nolen's choices of guitars and amplifiers also affected the sound for which he would be nicknamed.

In his recordings with James Brown, Jimmy Nolen used a Gibson ES-175 and an ES-5 switchmaster. He also relied on a Gibson Les Paul Recording model with single coil pickups, an Acoustic Black Widow, and a Fresher Straighter. The single coil pickups on these guitars produced a thin "chanky" sound; Nolen ran these guitars through a Fender Twin Reverb with the treble set at 8 out of 10. The result was a rhythm guitar sound that seemed to float somewhere between the low-end thump of the electric bass and the cutting tone of the snare and hi-hats, with a rhythmically melodic feel that fell deep in the pocket. A good example of such tone would be in James Brown's "I Got You (I Feel Good)" and "I Got The Feeling." Nolen had been experimenting with the sound prior to his joining James Brown: it can be heard on the Johnny Otis song "Willie and the Hand Jive" (1958) and Henry Mancini's "Swinging Peter Gunn Theme (Parts 1&2)(1960) on Fidelity Records, a subsidiary of Art Rupe's Specialty Records.

== Hip hop legacy ==
Nolen defined a guitar style which influenced decades of guitarists and funk groups to follow, including Earth Wind and Fire, Tower of Power, Chic, and George Clinton. James Brown and Jimmy Nolen's cuts such as "The Payback", "Papas Got a Brand New Bag", "Cold Sweat", "Funky Drummer," and "The Boss" have been sampled and utilized by countless producers, DJs, and MCs. "Funky Drummer" was sampled by many rap acts such as Public Enemy, N.W.A., LL Cool J and Run-DMC. "The Boss" was sampled by Ice T, De La Soul, and Nas. Snoop Doggy Dogg, Coolio, and Black Street used his 1973 funky song "Blind Man Can See It". Boogie Boys used "The Payback" in 1988. Nolen’s step son is hip hop producer Dallas Austin.

== Bibliography ==
- Thompson, Dave. Funk. Detroit: Backbeat Books, 2001. pp. 11–14. ISBN 978-0879306298
