= King Records (United States) =

Record label, active 1943–1968

- Parent company: Gusto Records
- Founded: 1943
- Founder: Syd Nathan
- Genre: R&B; country; soul; blues; funk
- Country of origin: United States
- Location: Cincinnati, Ohio

King Records is an American label founded in 1943 by Syd Nathan in Cincinnati, Ohio. The label owned several divisions, including Federal Records, which launched the career of James Brown. It released original material until 1975.

== History ==
King Records first specialized in country music, then called hillbilly music. King advertised, "If it's a King, It's a Hillbilly–If it's a Hillbilly, it's a King." One of the label's hits was "I'm Using My Bible for a Road Map" by Reno and Smiley. Important recordings in this field were made by the Delmore Brothers and Wayne Raney. The Delmores and Moon Mullican played a country-boogie style that was similar to rockabilly. Several King artists including Bill Beach, are in the Rockabilly Hall of Fame.

Queen Records was the "race records" division of King Records and was also owned by Syd Nathan. It was founded in 1943 and was eventually folded into King. King also owned Federal Records, which began the career of James Brown. The label hired Ralph Bass and recorded Hank Ballard & the Midnighters, Roy Brown, Valerie Carr, Champion Jack Dupree, Ivory Joe Hunter, Joe Tex, Johnny "Guitar" Watson, Otis Williams and the Charms and other R&B performers . King had a long legal suit against Brown after he repeatedly violated his contract with the company. King bought De Luxe Records (in 1952) and Bethlehem Records (in 1962). In 1951, Federal Records made the crossover of an R&B record into the white pop music charts with Billy Ward and his Dominoes' "Sixty Minute Man" (Federal 12022). It reached No. 17 on the Billboard pop chart and number 1 in the R&B chart.

Logo from 78-rpm record sleeve

King mixed the country and R&B sides of the label. Many of its country singers like Moon Mullican, the Delmore Brothers, Hawkshaw Hawkins, and Zeb Turner, covered the label's R&B songs, such as "Grandpa Stole My Baby", "Rocket to the Moon", "Bloodshot Eyes", and "I Got Loaded". R&B artists recorded country songs, for example, Bubber Johnson's "Keep a Light in the Window for Me".

During the 1950s, King distributed portable phonographs. King Records was unique among the independent labels because the entire production process was done in-house: recording, mastering, printing, pressing and shipping. That gave Nathan complete control, and a record could be recorded one day and shipped to radio stations the next day in quantities as small as 50. For that reason, King records that did not sell well are rare. Seymour Stein, a co-founder of Sire Records, interned at King Records as a high school student in 1957 and 1958 and worked for King from 1961 to 1963.

When Nathan died in 1968, King was acquired by Hal Neely's Starday Records and restarted as Starday-King Records. The songwriting team of Jerry Leiber and Mike Stoller bought the label in 1970 but sold it soon afterwards to LIN Broadcasting, which in turn sold it to Tennessee Recording & Publishing (owned by Freddy Bienstock, Hal Neely, and Leiber and Stoller), which sold it to Gusto Records in 1974. In 1971, James Brown's recording contract and back catalog were sold to Polydor Records. Also in 1971, the Cincinnati operations closed and the equipment was liquidated in early 1972. Since 2001, Collectables Records has been reissuing the King Records catalog.

== Studios ==
- King Records Studio Buildings
- U.S. National Register of Historic Places
- Cincinnati Local Historic Landmark
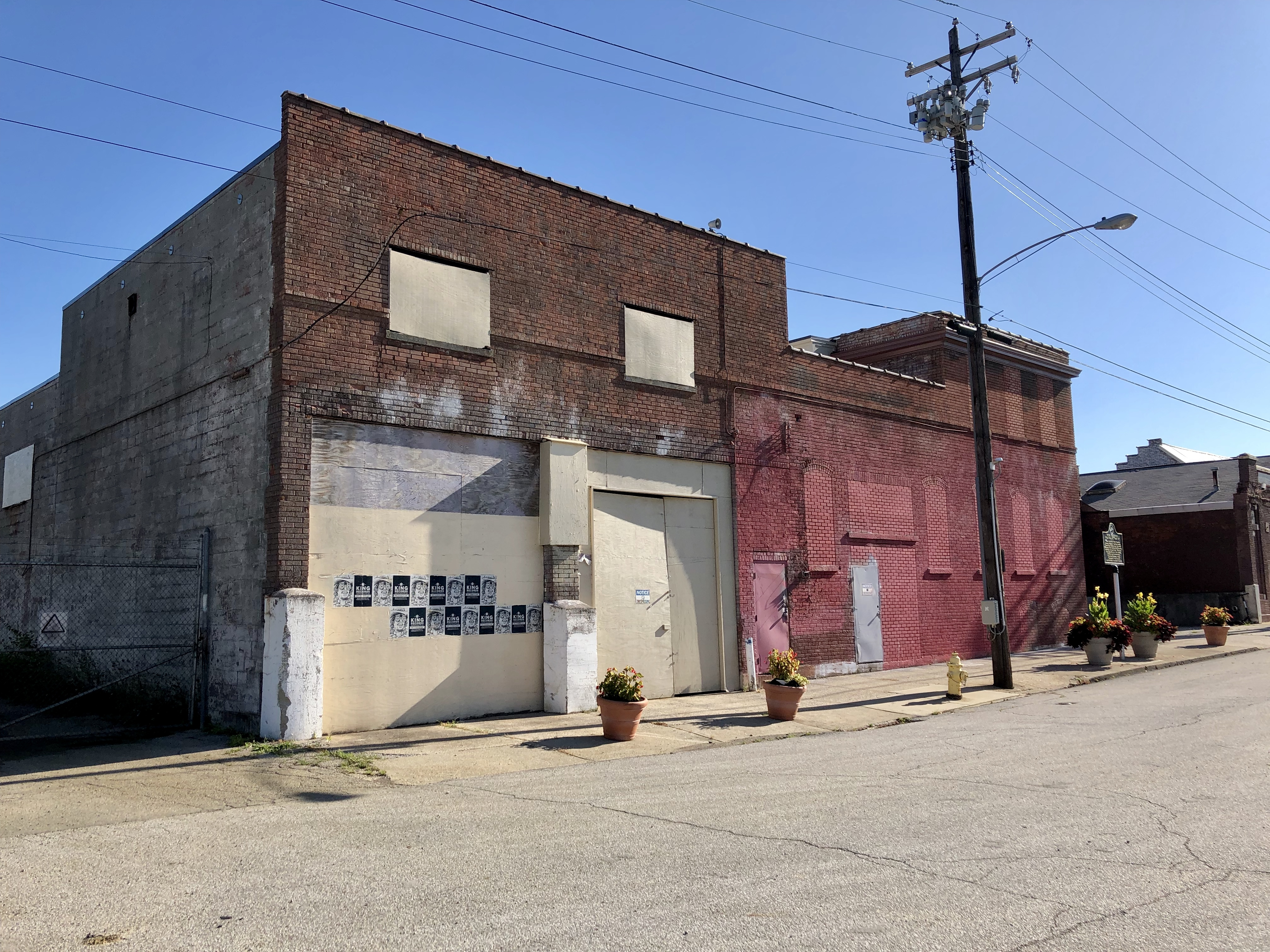
- Location: Evanston, Cincinnati, Ohio, U.S.
- Coordinates: 39.1442°N 84.4764°W
- NRHP reference No.: 100008067
- Added to NRHP: September 6, 2022

The former King Records headquarters, at 1540 Brewster Avenue in Cincinnati, is still standing. A historical marker was placed by the Rock and Roll Hall of Fame in 2008. Now owned by the city of Cincinnati, it approved the formation of the King Records Legacy Committee which works to revitalize the historic site and chronicle its history.

The King Records studios were designated as a Cincinnati Local Historic Landmark in 2015, and listed on the National Register of Historic Places in 2022. In 2025, a documentary of the history of the company titled King of Them All: the Story of King Records was broadcast on PBS in the United States.

== Discography ==
=== King 500 Series ===
The King 500 Series of 12 inch LPs were released between 1956 and 1959.

Catalog No.	Album	Artist	Details
500	The Best of Bostic	Earl Bostic	
501	Tiny Bradshaw	Tiny Bradshaw	
502	Moondust	Bill Doggett	
503	Earl Bostic for You	Earl Bostic	
504	Organ Reveries	George Wright	also released as Giant Organ Magic
505	A Concert of Cool Jazz	Cecil Young Quartet	
506	Modern Jazz Expressions	Eddie "Lockjaw" Davis	also released as Modern Jazz
507	House Party	Ruth Wallis	
508	Mood Indigo	Bill Jennings	
509	Favorite Organ Solos	George Wright	also released as George Wright Plays Hotsy-Totsy Organ
510	Jazz for Happy Feet	Tommy Reynolds and Band	
511	Love Is Here to Stay	Shura at the Piano	
512	Shura at the Piano	Shura and His Trio	
513	All Star Rock and Roll Revue	Various Artists	
514	Hot Doggett	Bill Doggett	
515	Altotude	Earl Bostic	
516	Showcase	Dell Staton Trio	
517	Orchids in the Moonlight	Emil Coleman and the Society Orchestra	
518	Meet Me Tonight in Dreamland	Paul Renard	
519	Amen	Wings Over Jordan Choir	
520	Lonesome Road	Lonnie Johnson	
521	In the Evening by the Moonlight	Johnny Long and Orchestra	
522	Borrah Minevitch and the Harmonica Rascals	Borrah Minevitch	released on DeLuxe label
523	As You Desire Me	Bill Doggett	
524	Free for All	Stan Free Trio	
525	Dance Time	Earl Bostic	
526	Jazz with a Horn	Eddie "Lockjaw" Davis	
527	Billy in the Lion's Den	Bill Jennings - Leo Parker Quartet	
528	After Hours	Various Artists	
529	Let's Dance with Earl Bostic	Earl Bostic	
530	Big Jay in 3-D	Big Jay McNeely	reissue of Federal label LP
531	Everybody Dance the Honky Tonk	Bill Doggett	
532	Dame Dreaming	Bill Doggett	
533	A Salute to Ellington	Bill Doggett	
534	Yiddish Songs	Jennie Goldstein and Betty Reilly	released on DeLuxe label - also released as Mink...Shmink (As Long As You're Healthy)
535	Something Old... Something New	Ink Spots	
536	Rock'n Roll Dance Party	Various Artists	
537	All-Time Country and Western Hits	Various Artists	
538	Rag Beat	Eddie "Piano" Miller	
539	Triple Threat	Roland Kirk	
540	Piano Variations	Various Artists	
541	Their Greatest Hits	The Midnighters	released on the Federal label
542	This Is Lorez	Lorez Alexandria and the King Fleming Quintet	
543	Adventure with Charlie	Charlie Ventura	
544	The Jones Girl...Etta...Sings, Sings, Sings	Etta Jones	
545	Dance Music for Mom and Dad	Paul Renard	
546	Meet John Puckett and His Piano	John Puckett	
547	Invitation to Dance with Bostic	Earl Bostic	
548	Billy Ward and His Dominoes featuring Clyde McPhatter	Billy Ward and his Dominoes	released on the Federal label
549	The Platters	The Platters	released on the Federal label
550	Sacred Songs	Don Reno and Red Smiley	
551	Sacred Songs	The Brown's Ferry Four	
552	Instrumentals by Don Reno and Red Smiley	Don Reno, Red Smiley and the Tennessee Cutups	
553	Cowboy Copas Sings His All-Time Hits	Cowboy Copas	
554	Grandpa Jones Sings His Greatest Hits	Grandpa Jones	
555	Moon Mullican Sings His All-Time Greatest Hits	Moon Mullican	
556	Favorite Sacred Songs	Various Artists	
557	Doggett Beat for Dancing Feet	Bill Doggett	
558	C'mon and Dance	Earl Bostic	
559	Clyde McPhatter with Billy Ward and His Dominoes	Clyde McPhatter with Billy Ward and His Dominoes	released on the Federal label
560	Deep River	Wings Over Jordan Choir	
561	Jazz Goes Ivy League	Johnnie Pate Trio Plus Three	
562	Square Dance Music	Fiddlin' Red Herron / Fiddlin' Linvilles / Curly Fox	
563	Candle Glow	Bill Doggett	
564	Fever	Little Willie John	
565	Lorez Sings Pres: A Tribute to Lester Young	Lorez Alexandria	
566	Jazz with a Beat	Eddie "Lockjaw" Davis	
567	Sacred Songs	Swanee River Boys	
568	Moody Blues: Play Only After Midnight	Sonny Thompson	
569	Come Home	Bubber Johnson	
570	Otis Williams and the Charms Sing Their All-Time Hits	Otis Williams and the Charms	
571	Bostic Rocks	Earl Bostic	
572	Spirituals Volume 1	Swan's Silvertone Singers	
573	Spirituals Volume 2	Spirit of Memphis Quartet	
574	Spirituals Volume 3	Four Internes	
575	Spirituals Volume 4	Swan's Silvertone Singers	
576	Spirituals Volume 5	Various Artists	
577	Spirituals Volume 6	Spirit of Memphis Quartet	
578	Spirituals Volume 7	Swan's Silvertone Singers	
579	Instrumentals and Ballads	Don Reno and Red Smiley	
580	Dedicated to You	The "5" Royales	
581	The Midnighters Volume Two	The Midnighters	
582	Swingin' Easy	Bill Doggett and His Orchestra	
583	Bostic Showcase of Swinging Dance Hits	Earl Bostic	
584	Swingin' Flute	Johnny Pate	
585	Dance Awhile with Doggett	Bill Doggett	
586	16 Favorites Volume 1	The York Brothers	
587	Hawkshaw Hawkins Volume 1	Hawkshaw Hawkins	
588	Songs of the Hills	Wayne Raney	
589	Songs by the Delmore Brothers	The Delmore Brothers	
590	Sixteen Sacred Songs Volume 2	Brown's Ferry Four	
591	16 Favorites Volume 2	The York Brothers	
592	16 Favorites Volume 2	Hawkshaw Hawkins	
593	Steve Lawrence	Steve Lawrence	
594	Boyd Bennett	Boyd Bennett	
595	Bonnie Lou Sings!	Bonnie Lou	
596	Talk to Me	Little Willie John	
597	Alto Magic in Hi Fi: A Dance Party with Bostic	Earl Bostic	
598	Golden Years in Hi-Fi	Bob Kames	
599	Big Beat Jazz	Eddie "Lockjaw" Davis	

=== King 600 Series ===
The King 600 series was released between 1958 and 1960.

Catalog No.	Album	Artist	Details
600	12 Songs of Christmas	Bill Doggett	
601	Good Songs, Rare Wine Will Live Forever	Bob Kames	
602	Sweet Tunes of the Fantastic 50's	Earl Bostic	
603	Mister Little Willie John	Little Willie John	
604	Blue and Moody	Lula Reed	
605	16 of His Greatest Hits	Ivory Joe Hunter	
606	Uptown	Eddie Davis	
607	Battle of the Blues	Roy Brown / Wynonie Harris	split album
608	Broadway Beat	Harold Baker Quartet	
609	Hold It	Bill Doggett	
610	Please, Please, Please	James Brown and His Famous Flames	
611	A Date with Pate	Johnny Pate	
612	Songs I'm Sure You Remember	Bob Kames	
613	Dance Music from the Bostic Workshop	Earl Bostic	
614	This Is Otis Williams	Otis Williams and His Charms	
615	Stanley Brothers and the Clinch Mountain Boys	The Stanley Brothers	
616	The "5" Royales Sing for You	The "5" Royales	
617	Someone Will Love Me in Heaven	Don Reno and Red Smiley	
618	Singin' and Swingin'	Hank Ballard and the Midnighters	
619	Hymns and Sacred Songs	Cowboy Copas	
620	Earl Bostic Plays Sweet Tunes of the Roaring 20's	Earl Bostic	
621	Good Old Country Ballads	Don Reno and Red Smiley	
622	Memory Lane	Little Esther	
623	Dancing on Sunset Strip	Dick Stabile	
624	Sweet Love Songs	Bubber Johnson	
625	Strictly Country Tunes	Grandpa Jones	
626	Here's Lookin' Atcha	Johnny "Scat" Davis	
627	Battle of the Blues Volume 2	Wynonie Harris / Roy Brown	split album
628	Moon Mullican Sings and Plays 16 Favorite Tunes	Moon Mullican	
629	The Sensational Donnie Elbert Sings	Donnie Elbert	
630	The Enchanting Organ of Bob Kames	Bob Kames	
631	Battle of the Organs	Luis Rivera / Doc Bagby	split album
632	Earl Bostic Plays the Sweet Tunes of the Swinging '30s	Earl Bostic	
633	High and Wide	Bill Doggett	
634	Battle of the Blues Volume 3	Eddie Vinson / Jimmy Witherspoon	split album
635	Try Me!	James Brown and His Famous Flames	
636	Cha Cha Cha	Freddy Calo and Orchestra	
637	This and That	Eddie Davis and His Tenor Sax	
638	All Star Rock and Roll Revue	Various Artists	
639	Homer and Jethro Will Drive You Nuts with Their Version of the Standards	Homer and Jethro	
639	They Sure Are Corny	Homer and Jethro	
640	Sweet Tunes of the Sentimental 40s	Earl Bostic	
641	Big City Dance Party	Bill Doggett	
642	Songs That Will Live Forever	The Ink Spots	reissue of King LP 535
643	Fresh from the Country	The Carlisle Brothers	
644	Sincerely Yours-Goodbye My Love	Al Grant	
645	Hymns and Sacred Songs	Stanley Brothers	
646	A Variety of Country Songs	Reno and Smiley	
647	Ferlin Husky	Ferlin Husky	also released as Country Songs from the Heart
648	The One and Only	Webb Pierce	
649	Hotsy Totsy Organ	George Wright	reissue of King LP 509
650	Big "J" in 3-D	Big Jay McNeely and His Orchestra	reissue of Federal LP 530
651	The Platters	The Platters	reissue of Federal LP 549
652	Yesterday's Memories, Tomorrow's Dreams	Bob Kames	
653	Tribute to a Great Composer	Tiny Bradshaw	reissue of King LP 501 with the addition of 4 songs
654	Rock and Roll Revue Volume 2	Various Artists	
655	Mellow Blues for the Late Hours	Sonny Thompson	
656	Sacred Songs Volume 2	Reno and Smiley	
657	The Band Swings - Lorez Sings	Lorez Alexandria with Orchestra	
658	Dance Music that Hits the Spot	Todd Rhodes	
659	For the Evening Hours	Ruby Wright	
660	Music of Mexico	Pepe Villa	
661	The Golden Sound of Joe Howard	Joe Howard	
662	Musical Pearls	Earl Bostic	
663	Favorite Old Melodies	Paul Renard	
664	Deck of Cards	T. Texas Tyler	
665	A Battle of Saxes	Eddie Davis / Charlie Ventura	split album
666	Good Ole Mountain Music	J. E. Mainer's Mountaineers	
667	On Tour	Bill Doggett	
668	Battle of the Blues Volume 4	Eddie "Cleanhead" Vinson / Roy Brown / Wynonie Harris	
669	Collection of Standard Sacred Country Songs	Maddox Brothers and Rose	
670	20 Good Old Songs	Bob Kames	
671	The Late Cecil Gant: The Voice That Has Never Been Copied	Cecil Gant	
672	The Best of Hank Locklin	Hank Locklin	
673	The Drummer Man with the Big Beat	Cozy Cole	
674	The One and Only Hank Ballard and the Midnighters	Hank Ballard and the Midnighters	
675	Golden Goodies of Old Hawaii	Paul Blunt and the Islanders	
676	Standards with a Slight Touch of Jazz	Lorez Alexandria	
677	Maddox Brothers and Rose	Maddox Brothers and Rose	
678	The Five Royales	The "5" Royales	
679	15 Songs of Christmas	Bob Kames	
680	Merry Christmas from...	Various Artists	
681	The Many Moods of Moon Mullican	Moon Mullican	
682	Miami March Songs	Miami University Symphonic Band	
683	Think!	James Brown and the Famous Flames	
684	Gatemouth Moore Sings Blues	Gatemouth Moore	
685	Mallets of Four Thought	Jimmy Namaro and His Trio	
686	Favorites of Jimmy Dean	Jimmy Dean	
687	The Stewart Family Sings Country Sacred Songs	The Stewart Family	
688	The Five Keys	The Five Keys	
689	The Great Texan	T. Texas Tyler	
690	The Stanley Brothers Sing Everybody's Country Favorites	The Stanley Brothers	
691	In Action	Little Willie John	
692	R & B Hits Past and Present	The Five Keys	
693	Hymns and Sacred Gospel Songs	Reno and Smiley	
694	Music for Romantic Moments	Lennie Wilson and His Orchestra	
695	Golden Country Favorites	The Stewart Family	
696	Hawaiian Party	Bob Kames	
697	Country and Western Jamboree	Various Artists	
698	For the Good People	The Stanley Brothers	
699	Swing Your Partner	Doc Journell with Grady Heston and the Texsons	

=== King 700 Series ===
The King 700 series was released between 1960 and 1962.

Catalog No.	Album	Artist	Details
700	Mr. Rhythm and Blues	Hank Ballard and the Midnighters	also known as Finger Poppin' Time
701	Country Songs	Reno and Smiley	
702	Gospel Song Festival	Wally Fowler and the Oak Ridge Quartet	
703	Favorites	Irving Fields	
704	The Sophisticate of the Piano: Whispering Jazz	Kokomo Wellington	
705	Earl Bostic Plays Hit Tunes of Big Broadway Shows	Earl Bostic	
706	For Reminiscent Lovers	Bill Doggett	
707	Etta Jones Sings	Etta Jones	reissue of King LP 544
708	Let's Dress Up... and Go Dancing	Sammy Leeds and His Orchestra	
709	Live It Up!	Irving Fields	
710	All Time Country and Western Hits	Various Artists	
711	Charity Ball: Meet Charlie Kehrer and Dance	Charlie Kehrer	
712	The Don Miller Quartet	Don Miller	
713	Shhhhh! The Quiet Man	Ronnie Hollyman	
714	Tragic Tales of Love and Life	Cowboy Copas	
715	Mr. Hawkins at the Piano	Wendell Hawkins Trio	
716	The Big Sound	Al Belletto Sextet	
717	The Maharaja of the Saxophone	Lynn Hope	
718	Wanted	Reno and Smiley	
719	The Stanley's in Person	The Stanley Brothers	
720	Broken-Hearted Melodies	Cowboy Copas	
721	T. Texas Tyler	T. Texas Tyler	
722	It's Christmas Time	Bob Kames	
723	Back Again with More Bill Doggett	Bill Doggett	
724	Classics Go Latin	Irving Fields	
725	25 Years of Rhythm & Blues Hits	Various Artists	
726	Home Spun Humor	Various Artists	
727	John Lee Hooker Sings Blues	John Lee Hooker	compilation of 78 rpm singles from 1948-1950
728	Easy Livin'	Ferlin Husky	
729	Organ Bandstand	Paul Renard	
730	The Legendary Jimmy Osborne Vol. 2	Jimmy Osborne	
732	Gwen Bari Sings Intimate Love Songs	Gwen Bari with the Leo Norman Strings	
733	Billy Ward and His Dominoes Featuring Clyde McPhatter and Jackie Wilson	Billy Ward and His Dominoes	reissue of Federal LP-548
734	Songs Along the Way	T. Texas Tyler	
735	Champion Jack Dupree Sings the Blues	Champion Jack Dupree	
736	Let the Church Roll On	The Bible Way Church of God Choir	
737	Hit Makers and Their Record Breakers	Various Artists	
738	Hank Locklin Encores	Hank Locklin	
739	Sure Things	Little Willie John	
740	Spotlight on Hank Ballard	Hank Ballard and the Midnighters	
741	Organ with Percussion and Sound	Bob Kames	
742	Lox, Latin and Bongos	Irving Fields Trio	
743	The Amazing James Brown	James Brown and the Famous Flames	
744	Square Dance Volume 2	Doc Journell	
745	Solo Spotlights	Various Artists	
746	The Wonderful Wilburn Brothers	The Wilburn Brothers	
747	Polkas, Waltzes, Fox Trots	Bob Kames	
748	Let's Go Again	Hank Ballard and the Midnighters	
749	25 Years of Rhythm & Blues Hits Volume 2	Various Artists	
750	Old Time Camp Meeting	The Stanley Brothers	
751	Hot Rod	Charlie Ryan	
752	I'll Write Your Name in the Sand	Maddox Brothers and Rose	
753	Bumper Crop of All Stars	Various Artists	
755	Mexican Fiesta	Pepe Jaramillo	
756	Folk Songs of the Civil War	Reno and Smiley	
757	The French Singing Star	Gilbert Bécaud	
758	Yves Montand à Paris	Yves Montand	
759	Dance Along	Hank Ballard and the Midnighters	
760	The Parker Brothers Choir	The Parker Brothers	
761	Songs of Love	Yves Montand	
762	Freddy King Sings	Freddy King	
763	Gospel Songs by the Patterson Singers	The Patterson Singers	
764	There Is Only One Paris	George Jouvin	
765	A Variety Album	J. E. Mainer and His Mountaineers	
766	Strange Music	Michael Holliday	reissue of Bethlehem LP - Mike
767	The Sweet, the Hot, the Teen-Age Beat	Little Willie John	
768	Happy Holidays from Bob Kames	Bob Kames	
769	Soulful Sacred Songs	Wade Mainer's Mountaineers	
770	House Party	Charlie Kehrer Orchestra	
771	Night Train	James Brown / The Wobblers / Herb Hardesty / Henry Moore / Hank Marr /Clifford Scott	compilation of instrumentals also released as Twist Around and Jump Around
772	The Songs They Like Best	The Stanley Brothers and the Clinch Mountain Boys	
773	Let's Hide Away and Dance Away with Freddy King	Freddy King	
774	Paris Vol. 3	Yves Montand	
775	Charles Brown Sings Christmas Songs	Charles Brown	
776	Country Singing and Instrumentals	Reno and Smiley	
777	Boy - Girl - Boy	Freddy King, Lulu Reed and Sonny Thompson	
778	The Many Moods of Bill Doggett	Bill Doggett	
779	Smokey Smothers Sings the Backporch Blues	Smokey Smothers	
780	Good, Good, Twistin'	James Brown and His Famous Flames	also released as Shout and Shimmy and Excitement "Mr. Dynamite"
781	The Twisting Fools	Hank Ballard and the Midnighters	
782	Golden Harvest Volume 3	Jimmy Osborne	
783	Bob Kames Plays Show-Stoppers	Bob Kames	
785	30th Anniversary Album	The Delmore Brothers	
786	By Popular Demand	Earl Bostic	
787	Banjo Special	Reno and Smiley	
788	A Collection of 18 Spiritual Songs	The Galatian Singers	
789	Changes Mood to Trad Dixieland	The Big Ben Banjo Band	
790	Playing Corn with Cons on Every Finger!	Professor Douglas "Knuckles" O'Rourke	
791	Folk Song Festival	The Stanley Brothers	
792	Forgotten Million Sellers	Various Artists	
793	The Jumpin'	Hank Ballard and the Midnighters	
794	Reno and Smiley	Reno and Smiley	unissued
795	Music of Cincinnati	University of Cincinnati Bearcat Band	
798	Folk Spiritual Songs	James W. Davis and the Dobbs Singers	
799	Meet Mexie Marlowe	Mexie Marlowe	

=== King 800 Series ===
The King 800 series was released between 1962 and 1964.

Catalog No.	Album	Artist	Details
800	Remember How Great These Tunes Were in Years Gone By	Ernie Berger	
801	Gospel Ranger	Brother Claude Ely and the Cumberland Four	
802	Come On and Join Little Willie John at a Recording Session	Little Willie John	
803	Spiritual Christmas Songs	The Galatian Singers	
804	James Brown and His Famous Flames Tour the U.S.A.	James Brown and His Famous Flames	
805	Good Old Camp Meeting Songs	The Stanley Brothers	
806	Willa Dorsey and the Mighty Faith Increasers	Willa Dorsey and the Mighty Faith Increasers	
807	25 Years of Country and Western Sacred Gospel Spiritual Songs	Various Artists	
808	All New Hawkshaw Hawkins	Hawkshaw Hawkins	
809	Rollin' Along with Grandpa Jones	Grandpa Jones	
810	Kelly Brothers Sing a Page of Songs from the Good Book	The Kelly Brothers	
811	Christmas Songs by These Famous Country Artists	Various Artists	
812	Bob Kames Goes Western	Bob Kames	
813	Nashville Bandstand	Various Artists	
814	A Festival of Spiritual Songs	Mighty Faith Increasers	
815	The 1963 Sound of Hank Ballard	Hank Ballard and the Midnighters	
816	Another Day with Reno and Smiley	Reno and Smiley	
817	The Country Gentleman of Song	Cowboy Copas	
818	Sutmiller's Presents The Hi-Lites	The Hi-Lites	
819	A Carnival of Songs	Various Artists	
820	16 Great Country & Western Songs	The York Brothers	
821	Bossa Nova and Blues	Freddy King	
822	16 Sacred Gospel Songs	Grandpa Jones / Brown's Ferry Four	split album
823	14 Academy Award Winning Songs	Bob Kames	
824	As You Remember Him	Cowboy Copas	
825	A Scene Near My Country Home	Bill Duncan	
826	Live at the Apollo	James Brown	
827	Earl Bostic Plays Bossa Nova	Earl Bostic	
828	Folk 'n' Hill	Charlie Moore and Bill Napier	
829	Teentime: Latest Dance Steps	Hank Marr Trio Plus 3	
830	Bill Doggett Plays American Songs Bossa Nova Style	Bill Doggett	
831	Bobby Grove Sings It Was for You	Bobby Grove	
832	Big Ben's Banjo Band Sing Along Volume 1	The Big Ben Banjo Band	
833	All-Stars of Polkaland, U.S.A.	Polka All Stars	
834	Folk Concert from the Heart of America	The Stanley Brothers	
835	In Memory	Cowboy Copas / Hawkshaw Hawkins	split album
836	Sing Along Volume 2	Big Ben's Banjo Band	
837	Organ Jazz Giants	Various Artists	
838	Songs of the Fantastic 50's Vol. 2	Earl Bostic	
839	But Wild	Mickey Baker	
840	Favorite Songs of Texas Ruby	Texas Ruby	
841	The Polka King's Return	Romy Gosz	
842	The Music that Made Milwaukee Famous: Polkas	Louie Bashell	
843	Howdy Neighbors	Jimmie Logsdon	
845	Do You Remember When Grandpa Jones Sang These Songs!	Grandpa Jones	
846	Jazz as I Feel It	Earl Bostic	
847	Nashville Bandstand Number 2	Various Artists	
848	Cornier than Corn	Homer and Jethro	
850	The Legend of Cowboy Copas and Hawkshaw Hawkins	Cowboy Copas / Hawkshaw Hawkins	split album
851	Prisoner of Love	James Brown	
852	The Big Blues	Albert King	
853	The World's 15 Greatest Hymns	Reno and Smiley	
854	The French Singing French Star Volume 2	Gilbert Bécaud	
855	Surfin' on Wave Nine	Various Artists	
856	Freddy King Goes Surfin'	Freddy King	reissue of King LP 773 with overdubbed crowd noise
857	Johnny "Guitar" Watson	Johnny "Guitar" Watson	
858	Taken from Our Vaults: Volume 1	Hawkshaw Hawkins	
859	Turn Back the Clock	Various Artists	
860	Country Music from the Heart of the Country	Cecil Surratt and Smitty Smith	
861	The World's Best Five String Banjo	Don Reno and Red Smiley	
862	Hootenanny: America's Finest Folk Singing with 5-String Banjo	Various Artists	
863	Teenage Love Songs	Trini Lopez	
864	The Country Folk Music Spotlight	The Stanley Brothers	
865	It Won't Be This Way Always	The King Pins	
866	Truck Driver Songs	Various Artists	
867	Hank Ballard's Biggest Hits	Hank Ballard	
868	Impressions	Bill Doggett	
869	Railroad Songs	Various Artists	
870	Taken from Our Vaults: Volume 2	Hawkshaw Hawkins	
871	Songs of Rivers, Oceans and Seas	Various Artists	
872	Banjo in the Hills	The Stanley Brothers	
873	From Our Vaults: Volume 3	Hawkshaw Hawkins	
874	The True Meaning of Christmas	Don Reno and Red Smiley	
875	Everybodys Favorite Blues	Various Artists	
876	Western Swing: Famous Western Bands	Various Artists	
877	More of...	Trini Lopez	
878	The Great Charles Brown That Will Grip Your Heart	Charles Brown	
879	The Best of Waite Hoyt: In the Rain Volume 1	Waite Hoyt	
880	The Best of Moore & Napier	Charlie Moore and Bill Napier	
881	The Best of Earl Bostic Volume 2	Earl Bostic	
882	Look Who's Surfin' Now	Various Artists	
883	Pure Dynamite! Live at the Royal	James Brown	
884	Top Rhythm & Blues Artists Do the Greatest Country Songs	Various Artists	
885	Taken from Our Vaults: A Real Collectors Item	Memphis Slim	
886	Impact!	The Impacs	
887	In Memory: The Delmore Brothers	The Delmore Brothers	unissued - reassigned as King 910
888	The Other Side of Grandpa Jones	Grandpa Jones	
889	Greatest Hits	Eugene Church	unissued
890	14 Great All Time Country & Western Waltzes for the Folks Who Like Waltzes	Various Artists	
891	The Best of Clyde Moody	Clyde Moody	
892	The Very Best of Jimmie Osborne	Jimmie Osborne	
893	14 Hit Flashbacks from Golden Group Era	Various Artists	
894	Hymns	Lloyd Cowboy Copas	
895	Of All the Songs I've Recorded, I Like These Best	Little Willie John	
896	A Star in Your Eyes	Hank Ballard	
897	Fireside Songs	Chickie Williams	unissued
898	Songs of Zion	Church of God and Saints of Christ Singers	
899	Live at the Club 502	Hank Marr Quartette	

=== King 900 Series ===
The King 900 series was released between 1964 and 1966.

Catalog No.	Album	Artist	Details
900	A New Sound	Earl Bostic	
901	Favorite Traveling Salesman Stories	Kermit Schaefer	
902	Latest and Greatest Blooperama	Kermit Schaefer	
903	The Gray Matter of Paul Gray	Paul Gray	
904	Saucy Hit Parade	Ruth Wallis	Reissue of Wallis Original WLP 11
906	Golf Par-Tee Fun!: A Collection of Hilarious Locker Room Humor!	Kermit Schaefer	
908	The Best of Bill Doggett	Bill Doggett	
909	Please, Please, Please	James Brown and His Famous Flames	reissue of King LP 610 with a new cover and number
910	In Memory: Volume 1	The Delmore Brothers	
911	On the Road with Reno & Smiley: Songs Truck Drivers Love!	Reno and Smiley	
912	I'm Tore Up	Crash Craddock	
913	Those Lazy, Lazy Days	Hank Ballard and the Midnighters	
914	Reno and Smiley Sing a Bluegrass Tribute to Cowboy Copas	Reno and Smiley	
915	Polka Music and Golden Waltzes	Bob Kames	
916	A Week-End with the Impacs	The Impacs	
917	Country Hymnal	Charlie Moore and Bill Napier	
918	Hymns of the Cross	The Stanley Brothers	
919	The Unbeatable 16 Hits	James Brown and the Famous Flames	reissue of Try Me, King LP 635, with a new cover and title.
920	In Memory of the Delmore Brothers: Volume 2	The Delmore Brothers	
921	Earl Bostic Plays the Great Hits Of 1964	Earl Bostic	
922	City Folks Back on the Farm: 12 Variety Bluegrass Songs	Charlie Moore and Bill Napier	
923	Just a Real Nice American Family	The Parker Family	
924	The Remarkable Stanley Brothers Play and Sing Bluegrass Songs for You	The Stanley Brothers	
925	Personally Yours from the Cincinnatians at Christmastime	The Cincinnatians	
927	Glad Songs, Sad Songs...	Hank Ballard and His Midnighters	
928	Freddy King Gives You a Bonanza of Instrumentals	Freddy King	
930	The Lovable Style of Bobby Freeman	Bobby Freeman	
931	Freddy King Sings Again	Freddy King	
932	Reno & Smiley's Variety Show	Reno and Smiley	
933	On and Off Stage	Hank Marr	
934	Bob Kames	Bob Kames	
935	The Best of Joe Tex	Joe Tex	
936	For All Lonesome Truck Drivers	Charlie Moore and Bill Napier	
937	Moon Mullican Sings 24 of His Favorite Tunes	Moon Mullican	
938	Papa's Got a Brand New Bag	James Brown	
939	Swan's Silvertone Singers	Swan's Silvertone Singers	reissue of King LP 572
940	Spiritual Songs	Galatian Singers	
941	Golden Harvest Best 24 Tunes	Jimmie Osborne	
942	Spirit of Memphis Quartet	Spirit Of Memphis Quartet	reissue of King LP 573
943	Fine Singing of Wonderful Sacred Country Songs	Brown's Ferry Four	
944	The York Brothers Sing 24 Songs	The York Brothers	
945	The Four Internes	The Four Internes	reissue of King LP 574
946	I Got You (I Feel Good)	James Brown	
947	Memorial to Earl Bostic: 24 Tunes That Earl Loved the Most	Earl Bostic	
948	Swan's Silvertones	Swan's Silvertones	reissue of King LP 575
949	Little Willie John Sings All Originals	Little Willie John	
950	Hank Ballard Wants You to Hear These Songs!	Hank Ballard	
951	The Trumpeteers / The Nightingales / The Patterson Singers	The Trumpeteers / The Nightingales / The Patterson Singers	reissue of King LP 576
952	24 Hit Tunes	Billy Wards and His Dominoes	
953	24 Great Songs	Tiny Bradshaw	
954	15 Soulful Songs Everybody Loves	Spirit of Memphis Quartet	reissue of King LP 577
955	All Hit Tunes	The Five Royals	
956	Roy Brown Sings 24 Hit Songs	Roy Brown	
957	15 Songs You'll Remember Forever	Swan's Silvertones	reissue of King LP 578
958	Lonnie Johnson Sings 24 Twelve Bar Blues	Lonnie Johnson	
959	Bonanza of 24 Songs	Bill Doggett	
960	Mr. Johnson: 24 Great Songs	Bubber Johnson	
961	Mighty Instrumentals	James Brown and the Famous Flames	
962	24 Songs By the Great Trini Lopez	Trini Lopez	
963	A Collection of Original Sacred Songs	The Stanley Brothers	
964	24 Vocals and Instrumentals	Freddy King	
965	24 Country & Western Sacred Songs	Various Artists	
966	Good Country Singing and Picking	Suratt and Smith	
967	24 Great Country Songs That Will Live Forever	Grandpa Jones	
981	Hank Ballard Sings 24 Great Songs	Hank Ballard	
982	Country Music Goes to Viet Nam	Charlie Moore and Bill Napier	
983	24 Great Country Songs	The Delmore Brothers	
984	Copas & Hawkshaw: 24 Great Songs	Cowboy Copas / Hawkshaw Hawkins	
985	It's a Man's Man's World	James Brown	
986	The Admiral's Daughter Sez: Here's Looking Up Your Hatch	Ruth Wallis	
987	Davy's Little Dinghy	Ruth Wallis	
988	Marry Go Round	Ruth Wallis	
989	Red Lights	Ruth Wallis	
990	Ubangi Me	Ruth Wallis	
991	Oil Man from Texas	Ruth Wallis	
992	He Wants A Little....Pizza	Ruth Wallis	
993	Bahama Mama	Ruth Wallis	
994	5 String Banjo Pickin' and Singin'	Various Artists	
995	24 Country Songs	Reno and Smiley	

=== King 1000 Series ===
The King 1000 series was released between 1966 and 1970.

Catalog No.	Album	Artist	Details
1002	Wolf at Your Door	Tommy Wolf	reissue of Fraternity LP
1004	25 Years of R & B Hits	Various Artists	
1005	24 Great Songs	Homer and Jethro	
1006	25 Years of Country & Western Hits By 24 Great Artists	Various Artists	
1007	24 All Time Great Christmas Songs	Bob Kames and the Caroleers	
1008	25 Years of Popular Music	Various Artists	
1009	The Happy Jazz of Osie Johnson	Osie Johnson	reissue of Bethlehem BCP-66
1010	James Brown Sings Christmas Songs	James Brown	
1011	Hank Marr Plays 24 Great Songs	Hank Marr, His Organ and Combo	
1013	The Best Loved Sacred Songs of the Carter Family	The Stanley Brothers	
1014	Spectacular Instrumentals	Charlie Moore and Bill Napier	
1016	James Brown Sings Raw Soul	James Brown	
1017	Gospel and Sacred Songs	Moore and Napier	
1018	Live at the Garden	James Brown	
1019	Jim Mover and the Moving Acapulco Brass	Jim Mover and the Acapulco Brass	
1020	Cold Sweat	James Brown	
1021	1968: Brand New Vocal Country and Western Songs	Moore and Napier	
1022	Live at the Apollo, Volume II	James Brown	
1023	All Time Hit Sacred and Gospel Songs	Various Artists	
1024	James Brown Presents His Show of Tomorrow	James Brown / Vicki Anderson / James Crawford / Marva Whitney / Hank Ballard / Bobby Byrd	
1025	Sounds from the Marr-Ket Place	Hank Marr	
1026	Rhythm and Blues: 18 All Time King Hits	Various Artists	
1027	Country and Western: 18 All Time King Hits	Various Artists	
1028	Brand New Country Songs	Ralph Stanley and the Clinch Mountain Boys	
1029	A Variety of New Sacred Gospel Songs	Don Reno, Bill Harrell and the Tennessee Cutups	
1030	I Can't Stand Myself When You Touch Me	James Brown	
1031	I Got the Feelin'	James Brown	
1032	Over the Sunset Hill	Ralph Stanley and the Clinch Mountain Boys	
1033	All the Way to Reno	Don Reno, Bill Harrell and the Tennessee Cutups	
1034	James Brown Plays Nothing But Soul	James Brown	
1036	The New Sound of Bob Kames	Bob Kames	
1037	Keep on Praying	The Galatian Singers	
1038	Thinking About Little Willie John and a Few Nice Things	James Brown	
1039	Merry Christmas	Bob Kames	
1040	A Soulful Christmas	James Brown	
1041	Take Your Shot	Bill Doggett	
1042	Living Legend of Country Music	Grandpa Jones	
1043	Lonesome 7-7203	Hawkshaw Hawkins	
1044	I Know You're Married (But I Love You Still)	Reno and Smiley	
1045	Sentimental Journey	Bob Kames	
1046	How Far to Little Rock?	The Stanley Brothers	
1047	Say it Loud – I'm Black and I'm Proud	James Brown	
1048	Harlem Nocturne	Earl Bostic	
1049	Tragic Romance	Cowboy Copas	
1050	Radar Blues	Various Artists	
1051	Gettin' Down to It	James Brown	
1052	You Can't Keep a Good Man Down	Hank Ballard	
1053	I Sing Soul with James Brown	Marva Whitney	unissued
1054	At Home and at Church	Brother Claude Ely	
1055	The Popcorn	James Brown	
1056	Pattern My Life	Marvin Anderson Singers	
1057	Burden to the Lord	Skylight Singers of New York	
1058	Thank You	Original Calvary Singers	
1059	Hideaway	Freddy King	
1060	Travelin' to California	Albert King	
1061	Greasy Spoon	Hank Marr	
1062	It's My Thing	Marva Whitney	
1063	It's a Mother	James Brown	
1064	The Country Side of Arthur Prysock	Arthur Prysock	
1065	Fastest Five Strings Alive	Don Reno	
1066	Where the Soul Trees Grow	Arthur Prysock	
1067	The Lord Is My Shepherd	Arthur Prysock	
1068	I'm Using By Bible for a Roadmap	Don Reno and Bill Harrell	
1069	Hills of Home	Ralph Stanley and the Clinch Mountain Boys	
1070	Do You Believe	Gospel-Ettes	
1071	Journey to the Moon: The Flight of Apollo 11	Bill Dunnavant and Bob Dunnavant	
1072	Bare Facts	Redd Foxx	
1073	Pass the Apple, Eve: Part 2	Redd Foxx	
1074	In a Nutshell	Redd Foxx	
1075	Paris Soul Food	Hal Singer	
1076	Precious Lord	Harmonizing Four	
1077	This Is the Right Time	Institutional Church of God in Christ	
1078	Honky Tonk Popcorn	Bill Doggett	
1079	Live and Lowdown at the Apollo	Marva Whitney	
1081	Free at Last	Little Willie John	
1082	Messin' Around with the Blues	Memphis Slim	
1083	Tomorrow Night	Lonnie Johnson	
1084	Blues for Everybody	Champion Jack Dupree	
1085	Moanin' and Stompin' Blues	John Lee Hooker	
1086	Good Rockin' Blues	Wynonie Harris	
1087	Cherry Red Blues	Eddie Vinson	
1088	Fly My Love	Arthur Prysock	
1089	We Need Time	Kay Robinson	
1090	The Best of the Delmore Brothers	The Delmore Brothers	
1091	The Best of Reno and Smiley	Reno and Smiley	
1092	Ain't It Funky	James Brown	
1093	His Hands	Stars of Virginia	
1094	A Soldier's Plea	The Smith Evangelist Choir	
1095	It's a New Day – Let a Man Come In	James Brown	
1096	The Tokyo Happy Coats Live	The Tokyo Happy Coats	
1097	The Nearness of You	Bill Doggett	
1098	Faded Picture Blues	Paul Howard / Ralph Willis	
1099	Beau Dollar	Beau Dollar	

=== King 1100 Series ===
The King 1100 series was released between 1970 and 1973.

Catalog No.	Album	Artist	Details
1100	Soul on Top	James Brown	
1101	Ram-Bunk-Shush	Bill Doggett	
1104	Sentimental Mood	Bill Doggett	
1105	Good Ole Bob Doing This Thing	Bob Shreve	
1106	World's Greatest Gospel Organist: His Last and Greatest Contribution	Alfred Bolden	
1107	Nobody But You	The Mighty Clouds of Harmony	
1108	Soft	Bill Doggett	
1109	Live in New York	The Galatian Singers	
1110	Sho' Is Funky Down Here	James Brown	
1111	Movin' Up	George Hines with the Gospel Winds	
1112	This Good Life	Roberta Sherwood	
1113	New Black Magic	Billy Daniels	
1114	Lord Here I Am	Marion Gaines Singers	
1115	Sex Machine	James Brown	
1116	Alive and Well and Living in... A Bitch of a World	Wayne Cochran and His C.C. Riders	
1117	Happiness Is Piano Red	Piano Red	
1118	I Need Help	Bobby Byrd	
1119	Have a Heart	Heart	
1120	Children of the Mist	David Anderson	
1121	Rev. Abraham Swanson and the Bibleway Church Choir	Rev. Abraham Swanson and the Bibleway Church Choir	Reissue of King LP 736
1122	Swampwater	Swampwater	
1123	Establishment	Establishment	
1124	Hey America	James Brown	
1125	Forevermore	The Tokyo Happy Coats	
1126	These are the J.B.'s	The J.B.'s	Unissued
1127	Super Bad	James Brown	
1128	Count Your Many Blessings	The Four Internes	
1129	Jesus Knows	The Patterson Singers	
1130	Hard Luck Blues	Roy Brown	
1131	Days Passed and Gone	The Spirit of Memphis Quartet	
1132	I Cried Holy	Swan's Silvertones	
1133	Risky Blues	Various Artists	10 inch record
1134	Unforgettable	Arthur Prysock	
1135	Matinee Idol	Redd Foxx	
1136	Hank and Lewie Wickham with Johnny Dagucon	Hank Wickham, Lewie Wickham and Johnny Dagucon	
1137	James Brown Live In Paris: Love, Power, Peace	James Brown	Scheduled to be James Brown's final album for King Records but was cancelled when his new contract with Polydor went into effect
1138	Patti Kim	Patti Kim	Unissued?
1139	In Memory of Robert Johnson	Paul Williams and Friends	
1140	Manuel and the Music of the Movies	Manuel	Reissue of 1970 Columbia LP
1141	Manuel and the Music of the Mountains	Manuel	Reissue of 1970 Columbia LP
1145	Jealous	Little Royal	
1146	The Coasters on Broadway	The Coasters	

== Labels associated with King records ==
- Audio Lab Records (King's budget album label)
- Bethlehem Records
- De Luxe Records
- Federal Records
- Festival Records
- Queen Records
- Starday Records

== See also ==
- List of record labels
