= JB40 – 40th Anniversary Collection =

Greatest hits album by James Brown
- Released: October 8, 1996
- Genres: Funk; soul; rhythm and blues
- Length: 2:27:29
- Labels: Polydor; Chronicle

James Brown chronology
Make It Funky – The Big Payback: 1971–1975 (1996)	JB40 – 40th Anniversary Collection (1996)	Dead on the Heavy Funk, 1975–1983 (1998)

Alternative cover
- 2006 reissue cover

Professional ratings
Review scores
Source	Rating
AllMusic (JB40)	5/5 stars
AllMusic (Gold)	4.5/5 stars
The Encyclopedia of Popular Music	4/5 stars
MusicHound Rock: The Essential Album Guide	4/5
Rolling Stone	5/5 stars
The Rolling Stone Album Guide	3/5 stars
Tom Hull	A

JB40 – 40th Anniversary Collection is a greatest hits album by James Brown. Following Brown's death in 2006, it was repackaged under Universal Music's Gold series.

== Track listing ==
Disc one

1. Please, Please, Please – 2:44
2. Try Me – 2:31
3. Good Good Lovin' – 2:14
4. I'll Go Crazy – 2:08
5. Think – 2:49
6. Lost Someone – 3:05
7. Night Train – 3:30
8. Prisoner of Love – 2:22
9. Out of Sight – 2:22
10. Papa's Got a Brand New Bag – 4:16
11. I Got You (I Feel Good) – 2:46
12. It's a Man's Man's Man's World – 2:46
13. Money Won't Change You – 2:45
14. Cold Sweat – 7:25
15. There Was a Time – 4:26
16. I Got the Feelin' – 2:37
17. Licking Stick – Licking Stick – 2:47
18. Say It Loud (I'm Black and I'm Proud) – 4:50
19. Give It Up or Turnit a Loose – 2:50
20. I Don't Want Nobody to Give Me Nothing (Open up the Door, or I'll Get it Myself) – 3:04
21. Mother Popcorn – 3:16
22. Ain't it Funky Now – 3:07

Disc two

1. Get Up (I Feel Like Being a) Sex Machine
2. Super Bad – 5:00
3. Soul Power – 3:20
4. Hot Pants – 3:06
5. Make It Funky – 3:14
6. Talkin' Loud and Sayin' Nothing – 3:23
7. King Heroin – 3:55
8. There It Is – 3:05
9. Get on the Good Foot – 3:34
10. Down and Out in New York City – 3:16
11. Doing It to Death – 5:04
12. The Payback – 7:38
13. Papa Don't Take No Mess – 4:29
14. My Thang – 4:14
15. Funky President (People It's Bad) – 4:01
16. Get Up Offa That Thing – 6:14
17. Bodyheat – 4:02
18. It's Too Funky in Here – 3:58
- The UK edition replaces "Ain't It Funky Now," "There It Is," and "Down and Out in New York City" with "Hey America," "The Boss," and "Living In America."

== Charts ==
2000 chart performance for JB40
Chart (2000)	Peak position
Norwegian Albums (VG-lista)	28

2025 chart performance for JB40
Chart (2025)	Peak position
Greek Albums (IFPI)	21
