= Food for Thought (The J.B.'s album) =

Studio album by The J.B.'s
- Released: June 1972
- Recorded: May 19, 1970 – February 1972
- Studio: King (Cincinnati, Ohio); Starday-King (Nashville, Tennessee); Bobby Smith (Macon, Georgia); Soundcraft (North Augusta, South Carolina); A & R (New York City)
- Genre: Funk
- Length: 35:46
- Label: People; 5601
- Producer: James Brown

The J.B.'s chronology
Food for Thought (1972)	Doing It To Death (1973)

Singles from Food For Thought
- 1. "The Grunt" Released: June 1970; 2. "These Are The J.B.'s" Released: 1971; 3. "Escape-ism" Released: May 1971; 4. "My Brother" Released: June 1971; 5. "Gimme Some More" Released: November 5, 1971; 6. "Theme from King Heroin" Released: February 1972; 7. "Pass the Peas / Hot Pants Road" Released: April 3, 1972

Professional ratings
Review scores
Source	Rating
Allmusic	3/5 stars

Food for Thought is the first studio album by The J.B.'s, released in June 1972 by People Records. Every track was previously released as a single except for "Wine Spot" and "Blessed Blackness".

== Track listing ==
Side One
No.	Title	Writer(s)	Length
1.	"Pass the Peas"	James Brown, John Starks, Charles Bobbit	3:30
2.	"Gimme Some More"	James Brown, Charles Bobbit	3:05
3.	"To My Brother"	James Brown	2:32
4.	"Wine Spot"	Fred Wesley, Charles Bobbit	3:29
5.	"Hot Pants Road"	James Brown, Charles Bobbit, St. Clair Pinckney	2:45
6.	"The Grunt"	James Brown, Clyde Stubblefield, Robert McCollough, Darryl Jamison, William Collins, Phelps Collins, Frank Waddy, Clayton Gunnells, Johnny Griggs	2:45

Side Two
No.	Title	Writer(s)	Length
7.	"Blessed Blackness"	Fred Wesley, Charles Bobbit	3:44
8.	"Escape-ism (Part 1)"	James Brown, David Matthews	3:16
9.	"Escape-ism (Part 2)"	James Brown, David Matthews	4:04
10.	"Theme From King Heroin"	James Brown, David Matthews, Charles Bobbit	3:08
11.	"These Are The J.B.'s"	James Brown, Johnny Griggs, St. Clair Pinckney, John Starks, Robert McCollough, William Collins, Phelps Collins, Darryl Jamison, Frank Waddy, Clayton Gunnells	3:01

== Personnel ==
=== The J.B.'s (1970) ===
"The Grunt", "These Are The J.B.'s"

- Clayton "Chicken" Gunnels, Darryl "Hasaan" Jamison – trumpet
- Robert McCollough, St. Clair Pinckney – tenor saxophone
- Bobby Byrd – piano
- Phelps "Catfish" Collins – electric guitar
- William "Bootsy" Collins – bass guitar
- unknown – maracas
- Frank Waddy, Clyde Stubblefield – drums

=== The J.B.'s (1971) ===
"Pass the Peas", "Gimme Some More", "To My Brother", "Hot Pants Road", "Escape-ism"

- Jerone "Jasaan" Sanford, Russell Crimes, Isiah "Ike" Oakley – trumpet
- Fred Wesley – trombone
- Jimmy Parker – alto saxophone
- St. Clair Pinckney – tenor saxophone
- James Brown, Bobby Byrd – electric organ, piano
- Hearlon "Cheese" Martin, Robert Coleman – electric guitar
- Fred Thomas – bass guitar
- Johnny Griggs – congas
- John "Jabo" Starks, Alfred Thomas – drums

=== Studio band arranged by James Brown and David Matthews (1971) ===
"Theme From King Heroin"

- Marvin Stamm, Danny Stiles – trumpet
- Joe Farrell, Seldon Powell – tenor saxophone, flute
- Richard Tee – electric organ
- Joe Beck, Sam Brown – electric guitar
- Michael Moore – bass guitar
- Billy Cobham – drums

=== Studio band arranged by Fred Wesley (1972) ===
"Wine Spot", "Blessed Blackness"

- Lew Soloff, Marvin Stamm – trumpet
- Fred Wesley – trombone
- Jerry Dodgion – alto saxophone, flute
- Joe Farrell – tenor saxophone, flute
- Charlie Brown – electric guitar
- Bob Cranshaw – bass guitar
- Jimmy Madison – drums
