= Get on the Good Foot (album) =

Get On the Good Foot

Studio album by James Brown
- Released: October 27, 1972
- Recorded: July 16, 1969 – October 1972
- Studio: Paramount Studios (Los Angeles, California); Bobby Smith Studios (Macon, Georgia); Rodel Studios (Washington, D.C.); A&R Studios (New York City, New York); Cavern Studios (Independence, Missouri); International Studios (Augusta, Georgia)
- Genre: Funk; R&B; Soul
- Length: 1:06:09
- Label: Polydor; PD2-3004
- Producer: James Brown

James Brown chronology
There It Is (1972)	Get On the Good Foot (1972)	Black Caesar (1973)

Singles from Get on the Good Foot
- 1. "My Part/Make It Funky" Released: October 1971; 2. "Get on the Good Foot" Released: July 1972; 3. "I Got a Bag of My Own / I Know It's True" Released: October 1972; 4. "Dirty Harri" Released: March 1973

Get On the Good Foot is the 34th studio album by American funk and soul musician James Brown. It was released as a double LP on October 27, 1972 by Polydor Records.

== Chart performance ==
The album debuted on Billboard magazine's Top LP's chart in the issue dated December 9, 1972, peaking at No. 68 during a seventeen-week run on the chart.

== Critical reception ==
Professional ratings
Review scores
Source	Rating
AllMusic	4/5 stars
Creem	B+
The Rolling Stone Album Guide	3.5/5 stars
Tom Hull – on the Web	B+
The Village Voice	B−

In a contemporary review for Rolling Stone, Russell Gersten said most of the album comprises a few "horrible" new songs and many "inferior" renditions of older songs from Brown, whom Gersten accused of repetitiveness and "egomania". Robert Christgau from The Village Voice said "if this were the world's only James Brown album it would be priceless. But there's a lot of waste here, and Brown's voice can't carry ballads the way it used to".

== Track listing ==
=== 1972 LP ===
Side 1
No.	Title	Writer(s)	Length
1.	"Get on the Good Foot (Parts 1 & 2)"	Brown, Fred Wesley, Joe Mims	5:46
2.	"The Whole World Needs Liberation"	Brown, Bobby Byrd	3:52
3.	"Your Love Was Good for Me"	J. J. Barnes, Whiz Whisenhut	3:20
4.	"Cold Sweat"	Brown, Alfred "Pee Wee" Ellis	2:55
Total length:			15:53

Side 2
No.	Title	Writer(s)	Length
5.	"Recitation by Hank Ballard"	Brown, Hank Ballard	5:55
6.	"I Got a Bag of My Own"	Brown	3:46
7.	"Nothing Beats a Try But a Fail"	Brown	3:15
8.	"Lost Someone"	Brown, Byrd, Lloyd Stallworth	3:55
Total length:			16:51

Side 3
No.	Title	Writer(s)	Length
9.	"Funky Side of Town"	Brown	7:51
10.	"Please, Please"	Brown, Johnny Terry	12:15
Total length:			20:06

Side 4
No.	Title	Writer(s)	Length
11.	"Ain't It a Groove"	Brown, Nat Jones	2:13
12.	"My Part/Make It Funky (Parts 3 & 4)"	Brown, Charles Bobbit	5:24
13.	"Dirty Harri"	Brown	6:12
Total length:			13:49

== Charts ==
Chart (1972)	Peak position
US Billboard Top LPs & Tape	68

=== 1992 CD ===
No.	Title	Writer(s)	Length
1.	"Get on the Good Foot (Parts 1 & 2)"	Brown, Wesley, Mims	5:44
2.	"The Whole World Needs Liberation"	Brown, Byrd	3:41
3.	"Your Love Was Good for Me"	Barnes, Whisenhut	3:20
4.	"Cold Sweat"	Brown, Ellis	2:53
5.	"Recitation by Hank Ballard"	Brown, Ballard	5:54
6.	"I Got a Bag of My Own"	Brown	3:30
7.	"Nothing Beats a Failure (But a Try)"	Brown	3:06
8.	"Lost Someone"	Brown, Byrd, Stallworth	3:56
9.	"Funky Side of Town"	Brown	7:50
10.	"Please, Please"	Brown, Terry	12:19
11.	"Ain't It a Groove"	Brown, Jones	2:10
12.	"My Part/Make It Funky (Parts 3 & 4)"	Brown, Bobbit	5:14
13.	"Dirty Harri"	Brown	6:15
14.	"I Know It's True" (bonus track)	Brown	4:07

== Personnel ==
- James Brown – lead vocals, organ
- Hank Ballard – vocals (Tracks 5 & 9)

The J.B.'s arranged by James Brown (Tracks 1, 10, 12 & 13)

- Bobby Byrd, Vicki Anderson, Martha High, Danny Ray – background vocals
- Russell Crimes, Isiah "Ike" Oakley, Jerone "Jasaan" Sanford – trumpet
- Fred Wesley – trombone
- Jimmy Parker – alto saxophone
- St. Clair Pinckney – tenor saxophone
- Bobby Byrd – organ
- Hearlon "Cheese" Martin, Bobby Roach, Robert Coleman, Jimmy Nolen – electric guitar
- Fred Thomas – bass
- John "Jabo" Starks – drums

Studio band arranged by David Matthews (Tracks 4, 6, 7, 9 & 11)

- Randy Brecker, Jon Faddis – trumpet
- Fred Wesley – trombone
- Jerry Dodgion – alto saxophone
- Joe Farrell, Michael Brecker – tenor saxophone
- Joe Temperley – baritone saxophone
- David Spinozza, Hugh McCracken, Sam Brown, probably Joe Beck – electric guitar
- David Spinozza or Sam Brown – acoustic guitar
- Michael Moore, Gordon Edwards – bass
- probably Johnny Griggs – congas
- Jimmy Madison – drums

Studio band arranged by Sammy Lowe (Tracks 3, 8, 14)

- unidentified – backing vocals
- Lou Soloff – trumpet
- Joe Farrell – tenor saxophone
- Richard Tee – piano
- unidentified – strings
- Hugh McCracken – electric guitar
- Gordon Edwards – bass
- Bernard "Pretty" Purdie – drums

The Original J.B.'s arranged by James Brown (Track 2, originally recorded as "The Wedge")

- Clayton "Chicken" Gunnells – trumpet
- Robert "Chopper" McCollough – tenor saxophone
- Phelps "Catfish" Collins – electric guitar
- William "Bootsy" Collins – bass
- Don Juan "Tiger" Martin – drums

Studio orchestra arranged by H. B. Barnum (Track 5, originally recorded as "World")

- A. D. Brisbois, Conte Candoli, Paul Hubinion, Allen DiRenzo – trumpet
- Harry Sigismonte, William Hinshaw – french horn
- Dick Leith – trombone
- unidentified – baritone saxophone
- Don Randi – organ
- James Vaughn – piano
- unidentified – strings
- Arthur Adamas, probably Kenny Poole – electric guitar
- Paul West – bass
- Earl Palmer or Ben Barrett – drums

- Bobby Byrd, Hal Neely, Lois Wong – overdubbed backing vocals (Track 2)
