= Hot Pants (James Brown song) =

Single by James Brown

from the album Hot Pants
- A-side: "Hot Pants Pt. 1 (She Got to Use What She Got to Get What She Wants)"
- B-side: "Hot Pants Pt. 2 & 3 (She Got to Use What She Got to Get What She Wants)"
- Released: July 1971
- Recorded: May 13, 1971, Starday-King Studios, Nashville, TN
- Genre: Funk
- Length: 3:08 (Pt. 1); 3:53 (Pt. 2 & 3); 8:42 (album version)
- Label: People; 2501
- Songwriters: James Brown; Fred Wesley
- Producer: James Brown

James Brown charting singles chronology
"Escape-ism (Part 1)" (1971)	"Hot Pants" (1971)	"Make It Funky (Part 1)" (1971)

Audio video
- "Hot Pants (She Got To Use What She Got To Get What She Wants)" on YouTube

"Hot Pants (She Got to Use What She Got to Get What She Wants)" is a 1971 song by the American singer James Brown, released as a single on his People Records label (then distributed by King Records) in July of that year with "Pt. 1" on the A-side and "Pt. 2 and 3" on the B-side. It marks his first new work without the prior version of backing band The J.B.'s. It was a number-one hit on the Billboard R&B chart, and reached number fifteen on the Hot 100 and number ten on the Cashbox magazine charts. "Hot Pants" was Brown's final release under King's purview before he and the People label moved to Polydor Records.

The song is an ode to the captivating power of hotpants, which Brown and his band first saw on their 1970 European tour. Like much of Brown's funk repertoire, "Hot Pants" has been extensively sampled by various hip-hop artists.

== Personnel ==
- James Brown – lead vocal
- Fred Wesley – trombone
- Jimmy Parker – alto saxophone
- St. Clair Pinckney – tenor saxophone
- Bobby Byrd – organ
- Hearlon "Cheese" Martin – guitar
- Robert Lee Coleman – guitar
- Fred Thomas – bass
- John "Jabo" Starks – drums
- Johnny Griggs – congas

== Other versions and related songs ==
Soon after moving to Polydor, Brown re-recorded "Hot Pants" for inclusion on the Hot Pants album. The 8:42 long album version, which was never released as a single, was recorded on July 12, 1971, at Rodel Studios in Washington, D.C., with the same personnel as the previous recording. This version of the song was later included on the 1986 compilation album In the Jungle Groove while the original single version (Parts 1, 2 & 3) was included on the 1996 compilation album Make It Funky - The Big Payback: 1971-1975.

Several of Brown's associates also recorded songs about the topic. In 1971, Brown's keyboardist Bobby Byrd recorded "Hot Pants – I'm Coming, I'm Coming, I'm Coming", released as a single on Brown's Brownstone Records. Byrd's "Hot Pants" has also been extensively sampled by pop and hip-hop artists. Byrd's wife Vicki Anderson also recorded an answer song, "I'm Too Tough For Mr. Big Stuff (Hot Pants)", for Brownstone. The J.B.'s recorded the instrumental "Hot Pants Road" as the B-side of their 1972 single "Pass the Peas" from the album Food for Thought. Brown's 1998 single "Funk on Ah Roll" from his album I'm Back reuses the guitar and horn parts of "Hot Pants".
