= Vox Ultrasonic =

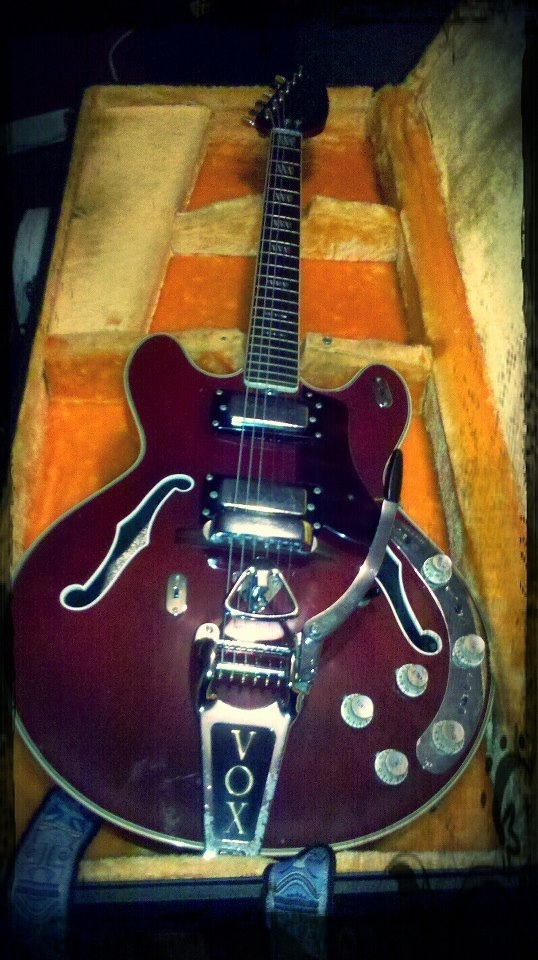
- 1968 Vox Ultrasonic
- Manufacturer: Vox
- Period: 1967 - 1968

Construction
- Body type: Hollowbody
- Neck joint: Bolt-on
- Scale: 25.5"

Woods
- Fretboard: Rosewood

Hardware
- Bridge: Floating bridge with adjustable saddles
- Pickup(s): 2 single-coil 'Ferro-sonic' pickups

Colors available
- Cherry Red or Sunburst

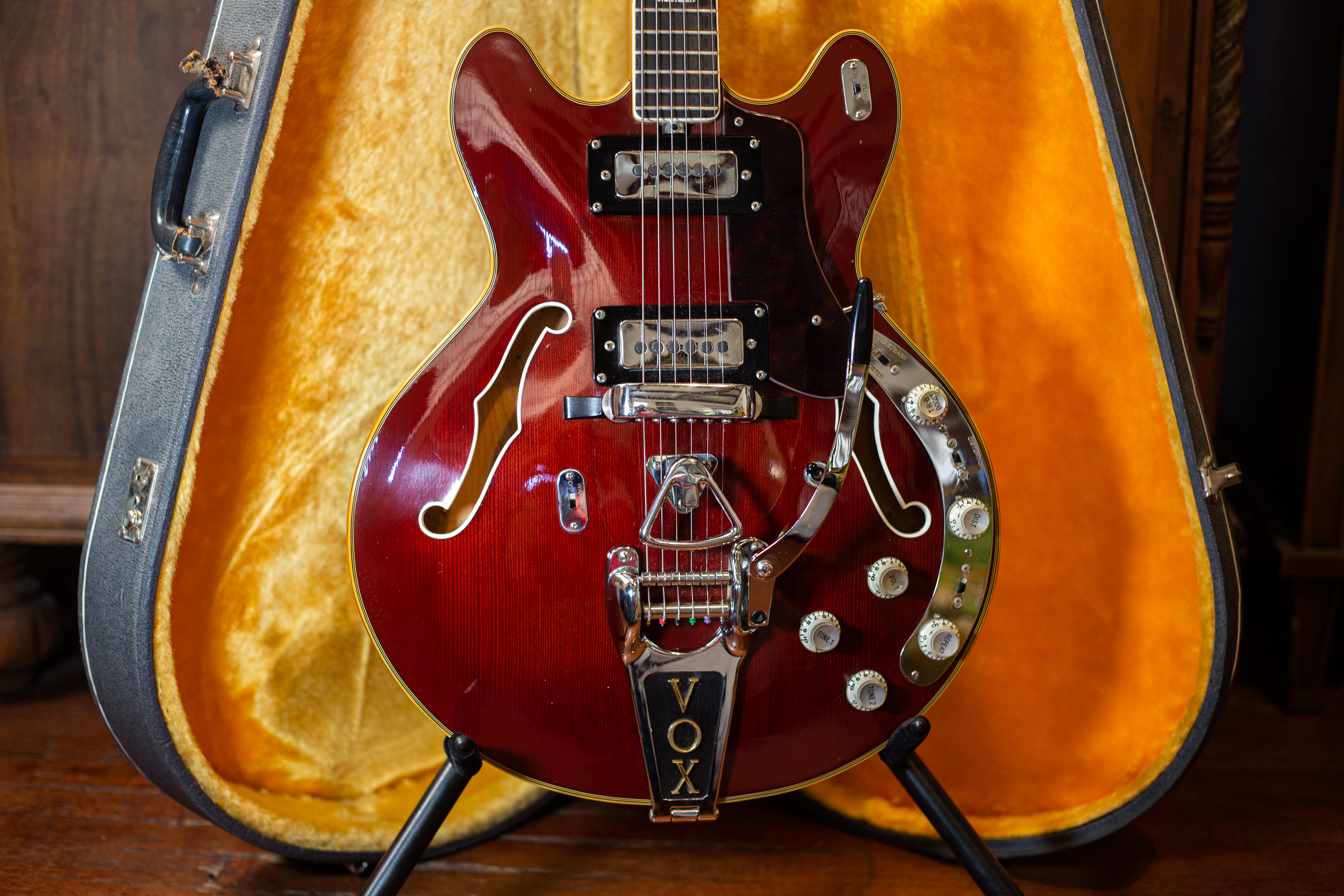
1968 Vox Ultrasonic

The Vox Ultrasonic or V268 was a mid- to late-1960s hollow body thinline electric guitar. The guitar's body resembled Gibson thinline models such as the ES-335, but otherwise was quite different. The Ultrasonic had no central maple block or set neck, making it more similar in construction to Fender's thinline guitar, the Coronado.

The Ultrasonic, like all late-1960s Vox models, was manufactured by the Eko company in Italy.

Vox were well regarded as effects box manufacturers and fitted numerous effects into their guitars as well. The Ultrasonic was their high-end guitar and therefore had all available effects built in: distortion, treble/bass booster, repeater, palm-operated wah-wah, and E-tuner.

== Notable Vox Ultrasonic players ==
- Catfish Collins of The J.B.'s and Funkadelic played the Vox Ultrasonic.
- Anton Newcombe of The Brian Jonestown Massacre is a notable user of the Vox Ultrasonic.
- Jimmy "Chank" Nolen, who played with James Brown also used an Ultrasonic, and a red Ultrasonic owned by Jimmy is currently in the Hard Rock Café in Myrtle Beach, SC.
- Dan Hayami of Japanese funk band called Osaka Monaurail plays the Vox Ultrasonic.

== Other Vox guitars ==
- Mark III (Brian Jones' Teardrop guitar)
- Mark VI
