= Make It Funky =

1971 single by James Brown

"Make It Funky (Part 1)"

Single by James Brown

from the album Get on the Good Foot
- B-side: "Make It Funky (Part 2)"
- Released: August 1971
- Recorded: July 13, 1971
- Studio: Rodel Studios (Washington, D.C.)
- Genre: Funk
- Length: 3:15 (Part 1); 4:05 (Part 2)
- Label: Polydor; 14088
- Songwriters: James Brown; Charles Bobbit
- Producer: James Brown

James Brown charting singles chronology
"Hot Pants Pt. 1 (She Got to Use What She Got to Get What She Wants)" (1971)	"Make It Funky (Part 1)" (1971)	"My Part/Make It Funky - Part 3" (1971)

Audio video
- "Make It Funky, Parts 1, 2, 3 & 4" on YouTube

"My Part/Make It Funky - Part 3"

Single by James Brown

from the album Get on the Good Foot
- B-side: "My Part/Make It Funky - Part 4"
- Released: October 1971
- Recorded: July 13, 1971
- Studio: Rodel Studios (Washington, D.C.)
- Genre: Funk
- Length: 2:39 and 2:48: 2:40 (Part 3); 2:50 (Part 4)
- Label: Polydor; 14098
- Songwriters: James Brown; Charles Bobbit
- Producer: James Brown

James Brown charting singles chronology
"Make It Funky (Part 1)" (1971)	"My Part/Make It Funky - Part 3" (1971)	"I'm a Greedy Man - Part I" (1971)

"Make It Funky" is a jam session recorded by James Brown with The J.B.'s. It was released as a two-part single in 1971, which reached No. 1 on the U.S. R&B chart and No. 22 on the U.S. Pop chart.

== Publication ==
This was James Brown's first song to be submitted solely to Polydor Records. The original master is very slow and steadily formed in tempo, compared to how it is performed live. It features the band members chanting the song's title and a prominent organ part played by Brown himself. Bobby Byrd also contributes vocals and a spoken intro. Despite receiving no songwriting credit, Fred Wesley arranged the horn section. Brown released the next 6 minutes of the recording as another two-part single, titled "My Part/Make It Funky", which charted #68 R&B. Parts 3 and 4 appeared on the album Get on the Good Foot.

Live versions of "Make It Funky" appear on the albums Revolution of the Mind and Live at the Apollo 1995. Brown also remade the song for his 1992 album Universal James under the title "Make It Funky 2000".

The full version, running 12:50, was released on the compilation Make It Funky – The Big Payback: 1971–1975 in 1996.

== Sample used ==
- Audio Two – "Make It Funky"
- Ice-T – "Make It Funky"
- Marley Marl – "Droppin' Science"
- Slum Village – "I Don't Know"
- Kingdom – "Every Beat of My Heart"

== Recognition ==
In 2005, the bassline to all four parts was ranked at number 2 in Stylus Magazine's list of the "Top 50 Basslines of All Time".

== Personnel ==
- James Brown – lead vocals, electric organ
- Bobby Byrd, Vicki Anderson, Martha High, Danny Ray, various bandmembers – backing vocals

with The J.B.'s:

- Jerone "Jasaan" Sanford, Russell Crimes – trumpet
- Fred Wesley – trombone
- Jimmy Parker – alto saxophone
- St. Clair Pinckney – tenor saxophone
- Hearlon "Cheese" Martin, Robert Coleman – electric guitar
- Fred Thomas – bass guitar
- John "Jabo" Starks – drums
