= Live at Chastain Park =

Live album by James Brown
- Released: 1988
- Recorded: January 1, 1985
- Venue: Chastain Park, Atlanta, GA
- Genre: Soul, funk
- Length: 57:25
- Label: Charly Groove

James Brown live albums chronology
Live in New York (1981)	Live at Chastain Park (1988)	Soul Session Live (1989)

Live at Chastain Park is a live album recorded by James Brown in 1985 at the titular city park in Atlanta, Georgia. Originally released in the UK and Europe in 1988 by Charly Records, it has been reissued numerous times on budget labels. The concert was also filmed and has been issued on DVD by Charly (on the 2008 release Double Dynamite) and other companies. Maceo Parker is featured on saxophone.

In 2006 the Music Avenue label released a two-CD version of the album containing additional outtakes from the concert along with a selection of remixes.

== Track listing ==
No.	Title	Writer(s)	Length
1.	"Give It Up or Turnit a Loose"	Charles Bobbit	2:04
2.	"It's Too Funky in Here"	George Jackson, Robert Miller, Brad Shapiro	4:56
3.	"Doing It to Death (Gonna Have a Funky Good Time)"	James Brown	4:01
4.	"Try Me"	James Brown	4:55
5.	"Get on the Good Foot"	James Brown, Joseph Mims, Fred Wesley	2:59
6.	"Get Up Offa That Thing"	Deanna Brown, James Brown	2:16
7.	"Georgia on My Mind"	Hoagy Carmichael, Stuart Gorrell	6:07
8.	"Hot Pants"	James Brown	1:33
9.	"I Got the Feelin'"	James Brown	1:41
10.	"It's a Man's, Man's, Man's World"	James Brown, Betty Jean Newsome	9:09
11.	"Cold Sweat"	James Brown, Alfred Ellis	1:11
12.	"I Can't Stand Myself (When You Touch Me)"	James Brown	1:54
13.	"Papa's Got a Brand New Bag"	James Brown	2:18
14.	"I Got You (I Feel Good)"	James Brown	3:39
15.	"Please, Please, Please"	James Brown, Johnny Terry	3:49
16.	"Jam"	James Brown	4:53
Total length:			57:25

== Personnel ==
- James Brown – vocals
- Ron Laster – guitar
- Tony Jones – guitar
- Jimmy Lee Moore – bass
- Larry Moore – keyboards
- Arthur Dickson – drums
- Tony Cook – drums
- Johnny Griggs – percussion, congas
- Maceo Parker – alto saxophone
- St. Clair Pinckney – tenor saxophone
- Joe Collier – trumpet
- George "Haji Ahkba" Dickerson – flugelhorn
- Martha High – background vocals
- "Sweet" Charles Sherrell – keyboards, band director
