= Doing It to Death (album) =

Studio album by the J.B.'s
- Released: 1973
- Recorded: January 29, 1973 (tracks 1 & 2); June 2, 1973
- Studio: International (Augusta, Georgia; tracks 1 & 2); A&R (New York City)
- Genre: Funk
- Length: 38:57
- Label: People
- Producer: James Brown

The J.B.'s chronology
Food For Thought (1972)	Doing It to Death (1973)	Breakin' Bread (1974)

Professional ratings
Review scores
Source	Rating
Allmusic	4.5/5 stars
Christgau's Record Guide	B

Doing It to Death is an album by The J.B.'s, released in 1973 by People Records. The album includes a ten-minute version of the #1 R&B hit "Doing It to Death", which is led by Danny Ray's introduction to simulate his MC in concerts.

The introduction, like many Brown's produced live albums, such as Live at the Apollo, Live at the Apollo, Volume II and Revolution of the Mind were sampled on hip hop and electronic music.

== Track listing ==
All songs were written and arranged by James Brown.

1. "Introduction to the J.B.'s" – 0:24
2. "Doing It to Death Parts 1 & 2" – 10:01
3. "You Can Have Watergate Just Gimme Some Bucks and I'll Be Straight" – 0:14
4. "More Peas" – 8:27
5. "La Di Da La Di Day" (from the Motion Picture Slaughter's Big Rip-Off) – 5:39
6. "You Can Have Watergate Just Gimme Some Bucks and I'll Be Straight" – 0:14
7. "Sucker" – 8:10
8. "You Can Have Watergate Just Gimme Some Bucks and I'll Be Straight" – 6:28

== Personnel ==
- James Brown – lead vocal, organ, arrangements
- Fred Wesley – trombone
- Darryl "Hasaan" Jamison – trumpet
- Jerone "Jasaan" Sanford - trumpet
- Ike Oakley – trumpet
- Maceo Parker – alto saxophone, flute
- St. Clair Pinckney – tenor saxophone
- Eldee Williams – tenor saxophone
- Hearlon "Cheese" Martin – guitar
- Jimmy Nolen – guitar
- Fred Thomas – bass
- John "Jabo" Starks – drums
- Bob Both – mixing at Advantage Studios, New York City
