= Gimme Some More (The J.B.'s song) =

Single by The J.B.'s

from the album Food for Thought
- B-side: "The Rabbit Got the Gun"
- Released: November 1971
- Recorded: September 2, 1971
- Studio: Soundcraft (North Augusta, South Carolina)
- Genre: Funk
- Length: 3:03
- Label: People; 602
- Songwriters: James Brown, Charles Bobbit
- Producer: James Brown

The J.B.'s singles chronology
"My Brother Pt. 1" (1971)	"Gimme Some More" (1971)	"Pass the Peas" (1972)

Audio video
- "Gimme Some More" on YouTube

"Gimme Some More" is a 1971 song written by James Brown and recorded by his band, The J.B.'s. Released as a single on People Records, "Gimme Some More" also appeared on the 1972 album Food for Thought.

A 1972 live performance of "Gimme Some More" is included on The J.B.'s' 1995 compilation album Funky Good Time: The Anthology. Additionally, the song was reworked by Brown into "Happy For The Poor" for the soundtrack of the 1973 blaxpoitation film Slaughter's Big Rip-off.

== Background ==
The song's lyrics consist solely of the song title, chanted by the whole band throughout the record.

== Personnel ==
Credits per liner notes by Alan Leeds.

- Jerone "Jasaan" Sanford, Russell Crimes, Isiah "Ike" Oakley – trumpet
- Fred Wesley – trombone
- Jimmy Parker, St. Clair Pinckney – tenor saxophone
- Bobby Byrd – electric organ, tambourine
- Robert Coleman, Hearlon "Cheese" Martin – electric guitar
- Fred Thomas – bass guitar
- John "Jabo" Starks – drums
- entire band – vocals

== Chart performance ==
"Gimme Some More" charted No. 11 R&B and No. 67 Pop in the US.

Chart (1972)	Peak position
U.S. Billboard Hot 100	67
U.S. Billboard Best Selling Soul Singles	11
