= Pass the Peas =

Single by The J.B.'s

from the album Food for Thought
- B-side: "Hot Pants Road"
- Released: April 1972
- Recorded: June 28 or 29, 1971
- Studio: Bobby Smith (Macon, Georgia)
- Genre: Funk
- Length: 3:25
- Label: People; 607
- Songwriters: James Brown; John Starks; Charles Bobbit
- Producer: James Brown

The J.B.'s singles chronology
"Gimme Some More" (1971)	"Pass the Peas" (1972)	"Givin' Up Food for Funk" (1972)

Audio video
- "Pass The Peas" on YouTube

"Pass the Peas" is a 1972 funk instrumental by The J.B.'s. Released as a single on People Records, it charted #29 R&B and #95 Pop. It was included on the 1972 album Food for Thought.

== Personnel ==
Credits per liner notes by Alan Leeds.

- Jerone "Jasaan" Sanford, Russell Crimes – trumpet
- Fred Wesley – trombone
- Jimmy Parker – alto saxophone
- St. Clair Pinckney – tenor saxophone
- James Brown – electric organ
- Hearlon "Cheese" Martin, Robert Coleman – electric guitar
- Fred Thomas – bass guitar
- John "Jabo" Starks – drums
- Bobby Roach – spoken introduction
- Bobby Byrd – spoken introduction
- entire band – vocals
