= Get on the Good Foot =

"Get on the Good Foot - Part 1"

Single by James Brown

from the album Get on the Good Foot
- B-side: "Get on the Good Foot - Part 2"
- Released: July 1972
- Recorded: May 9, 1972, Soundcraft Studios, North Augusta, SC
- Genre: Funk
- Length: 3:36 (Part 1); 2:39 (Part 2)
- Label: Polydor; 14139
- Songwriters: James Brown; Fred Wesley; Joseph Mims
- Producer: James Brown

James Brown charting singles chronology
"Honky Tonk - Part 1" (1972)	"Get on the Good Foot - Part 1" (1972)	"I Got a Bag of My Own" (1972)

Audio video
- "Get On The Good Foot (Pt.1 & 2)" on YouTube

"Get on the Good Foot" is a funk song performed by American musician James Brown. It was released in May 1972 by Polydor Records as a two-part single that peaked at numbers one and 18 on the US Billboard Hot R&B and Hot 100 charts. It also appeared on an album of the same name released that year. Partly due to the unwillingness of Brown's record labels to certify sales of his previous hits, "Get on the Good Foot" was his first gold record. Billboard ranked it as the No. 99 song for 1972. In 2022, Rolling Stone ranked it number 15 in their list of the "200 Greatest Dance Songs of All Time".

Performances of "Get on the Good Foot" appear on the albums Hot on the One, Live in New York, Live at Chastain Park and Live at the Apollo 1995.

== Personnel ==
- James Brown - lead vocal, organ

with The J.B.'s:

- Russell Crimes - trumpet
- Ike Oakley - trumpet
- Fred Wesley - trombone
- Jimmy Parker - alto saxophone
- St. Clair Pinckney - tenor saxophone
- Hearlon "Cheese" Martin - guitar
- Bobby Roach - guitar
- Fred Thomas - bass
- John "Jabo" Starks - drums

== Certifications ==
Region	Certification	Certified units/sales
United States (RIAA)	Gold	1,000,000^{^}
^{^} Shipments figures based on certification alone.
