= Live in New York (James Brown album) =

Live album by James Brown
- Released: 1981
- Recorded: March 26, 1980
- Venue: Studio 54, New York, NY
- Genre: Funk, soul
- Length: 1:18:12
- Label: Knockout; 1501

James Brown live albums chronology
Hot on the One (1980)	Live in New York (1981)	Live at Chastain Park (1988)

Live in New York is a 1981 live double album by James Brown. It was recorded in 1980 at the Studio 54 nightclub. It includes two studio instrumentals, "Brown's Inferno" and "Bay Ridge Boogy", performed by the Bay Ridge Band.

In 1982 a single-LP abbreviation of Live in New York's contents was released under the title Mean on the Scene (Audio Fidelity/Phoenix). Since then the contents of the original double LP have been reissued repeatedly, usually with the studio instrumentals (and sometimes other tracks) omitted, under titles including At Studio 54 (1994, Charly) and Live in New York 1980 (2009, Cleopatra).

A video recording of Brown's Studio 54 performance has received various releases, notably the 2008 DVD Double Dynamite (Charly). Unlike the album, these do not include the studio tracks or tracks 2 to 4 but have "Papa's Got a Brand New Bag" placed in the order it was actually performed, after "Cold Sweat".

== Track listing ==
No.	Title	Length
1.	"Too Funky in Here"	7:11
2.	"Funky Good Time"	2:43
3.	"Get Up Offa That Thing"	6:14
4.	"Body Heat"	5:21
5.	"Sex Machine"	6:45
6.	"Try Me"	4:30
7.	"Brown's Inferno" (Performed by Bay Ridge Band)	3:00
8.	"Papa's Got a Brand New Bag"	2:30
9.	"Good Foot"	4:15
10.	"This Is a Man's World"	14:00
11.	"Got That Feeling"	3:45
12.	"Cold Sweat"	3:13
13.	"Please, Please, Please"	3:00
14.	"Jam"	5:00
15.	"Bay Ridge Boogy" (Performed by Bay Ridge Band)	2:15
16.	"Medley: Payback/Too Funky in Here"	4:30
Total length:		1:18:12

== Personnel ==
- James Brown – lead vocals
- Martha High – background vocals
- Anne Beedling-McLeod – background vocals
- Hollie Farris – trumpet
- Jerone "Jasaan" Sanford – trumpet
- Joe Poff – alto saxophone
- St. Clair Pinckney – tenor saxophone
- Jimmy Nolen – guitar
- Ron Laster – guitar
- David Weston – bass
- "Sweet" Charles Sherrell – keyboards, music director
- Jerry Poindexter – keyboards
- Johnny Griggs – congas, cabasa
- Arthur Dickson – drums
- Danny Ray – M.C.
