= Gimme Some More (disambiguation) =

"Gimme Some More" is a song by Busta Rhymes from the album E.L.E. (Extinction Level Event): The Final World Front.

Gimme Some More may also refer to:

- "Gimme Some More" (The J.B.'s song), a song by the J.B.'s from the album Food for Thought
- "Gimme Some More", a 1969 song by Crazy Elephant
- "Gimme Some More", a song by Labi Siffre from the album Crying Laughing Loving Lying

== See also ==
- "Gimme More"
