= The Grunt =

"The Grunt (Part 1)"

Single by The J.B.'s

from the album Food for Thought
- B-side: "The Grunt (Part 2)"
- Released: June 1970
- Recorded: May 19, 1970
- Studio: King (Cincinnati, Ohio)
- Genre: Funk
- Length: 2:47 (Part 1); 2:10 (Part 2)
- Label: King; 6317
- Songwriters: James Brown; Clyde Stubblefield; Robert McCollough; Darryl Jamison; William Collins; Phelps Collins; Frank Waddy; Clayton Gunnels; Johnny Griggs
- Producer: James Brown

The J.B.'s singles chronology
"The Grunt (Part 1)" (1970)	"These Are The J.B.'s (Part 1)" (1970)

Audio video
- "The Grunt" on YouTube

"The Grunt" is a funk instrumental recorded in 1970 by James Brown's band The J.B.'s. It was released as a two-part single on King. It was one of only two instrumental singles recorded by the original J.B.'s lineup with Bootsy and Catfish Collins. Large parts of "The Grunt"'s melody and arrangement are borrowed, uncredited, from The Isley Brothers' song "Keep on Doin'", which was released earlier in the same year.

Part 1 of "The Grunt" was included on The J.B.'s' 1972 album Food for Thought.

== Personnel ==
- Clayton "Chicken" Gunnels – trumpet
- Darryl "Hasaan" Jamison – trumpet
- Robert McCollough – tenor saxophone
- Bobby Byrd – piano
- Phelps "Catfish" Collins – electric guitar
- William "Bootsy" Collins – bass guitar
- Frank Waddy – drums
- unidentified maracas

== Sampling ==
"The Grunt" has been a prolific source of samples for hip hop producers. Several different musical elements of the recording have been sampled, including a squealing saxophone glissando that begins the piece, a two-note saxophone riff that occurs in the middle of the recording, and the underlying rhythmic groove that continues throughout. Three different tracks on Public Enemy's album It Takes a Nation of Millions to Hold Us Back loop portions of the recording. Other artists who have sampled "The Grunt" include Eric B. and Rakim, 2 Live Crew, Jungle Brothers, Compton's Most Wanted, Ultramagnetic MCs, Wu-Tang Clan, Pete Rock & C.L. Smooth, The Black Eyed Peas and Joe Public.

It was featured in one of the Ultimate Breaks and Beats series of records in an extended remix format (Edition 522).

== Appearances in other media ==
"The Grunt" appears on the Grand Theft Auto: San Andreas soundtrack on the Master Sounds 98.3 station.
