= Hot on the One =

Live album by James Brown
- Released: July 1980
- Recorded: December 1979, Tokyo, Japan
- Genre: Soul, funk
- Length: 71:59
- Label: Polydor
- Producer: James Brown

James Brown live albums chronology
Revolution of the Mind: Recorded Live at the Apollo, Vol. III (1971)	Hot on the One (1980)	Live in New York (1981)

Hot on the One is a 1980 live double album by James Brown. Recorded in Tokyo, it was Brown's penultimate album for Polydor Records.

== Track listing ==
No.	Title	Writer(s)	Length
1.	"Introduction"		1:33
2.	"It's Too Funky in Here"	Brad Shapiro, George Jackson, Robert Miller, Walter Shaw	5:41
3.	"Gonna Have a Funky Good Time"	James Brown	2:48
4.	"Get Up Offa That Thing"	Deidre Brown, Deanna Brown, Yamma Brown	7:51
5.	"Body Heat"	Deidre Brown, Deanna Brown, Yamma Brown	8:08
6.	"I Got the Feelin'"	James Brown	4:08
7.	"Try Me"	James Brown	4:59
8.	"Sex Machine"	James Brown, Bobby Byrd, Ron Lenhoff	10:18
9.	"It's a Man's, Man's, Man's World"	James Brown	9:06
10.	"Get on the Good Foot"	James Brown, Fred Wesley, Joseph Mims	4:19
11.	"Papa's Got a Brand New Bag"	James Brown	1:51
12.	"Please, Please, Please"	James Brown, Johnny Terry	3:51
13.	"Jam"	James Brown, Deidre Brown	7:21
Total length:			71:59
