= Hot Pants (album) =

Studio album by James Brown
- Released: August 1971
- Recorded: April 8, 1971 ("Escape-Ism"); July 12, 1971 (remainder of titles)
- Studio: King Studios (Cincinnati, Ohio); Rodel Studios (Washington, D.C.)
- Genre: Funk
- Length: 30:26 (LP); 49:35 (CD)
- Label: Polydor; 2425 086
- Producer: James Brown

James Brown chronology
Sho Is Funky Down Here (1971)	Hot Pants (1971)	There It Is (1972)

Singles from Hot Pants
- 1. "Escape-Ism" Released: June 1971; 2. "Hot Pants (She Got To Use What She Got To Get What She Wants)" Released: June 1971

Professional ratings
Review scores
Source	Rating
AllMusic	3/5 stars
The Rolling Stone Album Guide	3.5/5 stars
Tom Hull – on the Web	A−

Hot Pants is the 32nd studio album by American musician James Brown. The album was released in August 1971, by Polydor Records.

== Chart performance ==
The album debuted on Billboard magazine's Top LP's chart in the issue dated September 4, 1971, peaking at No. 22 during an eighteen-week run on the chart.

== Track listing ==
All tracks are written by James Brown; except where indicated.

Side A
No.	Title	Writer(s)	Length
1.	"Blues & Pants"	Fred Wesley	9:39
2.	"Can't Stand It"		4:37

Side B
No.	Title	Length
3.	"Escape-Ism, Pt. 1"	3:18
4.	"Escape-Ism, Pt. 2"	4:10
5.	"Hot Pants (She Got To Use What She Got To Get What She Wants)"	8:42
Total length:		30:26

Bonus track on CD
No.	Title	Length
6.	"Escape-Ism (complete take)"	19:09
Total length:		49:35

== Charts ==
Chart (1971)	Peak position
US Billboard Top LPs	22

== Personnel ==
- James Brown – lead vocals, organ
- Bobby Byrd – backing vocals, organ ("Blues & Pants"), tambourine ("Hot Pants")
- Jerone "Jasaan" Sanford, Russell Crimes – trumpet (tracks 1, 2 & 5)
- Jimmy Parker – alto saxophone
- St. Clair Pinckney – tenor saxophone
- Fred Wesley – trombone
- Hearlon "Cheese" Martin, Robert Coleman – guitar
- Fred Thomas – bass
- Johnny Griggs – congas (tracks 3, 4 & 6)
- John "Jabo" Starks – drums
