= Soul Power =

1971 single by James Brown

"Soul Power Pt. 1"

Single by James Brown
- B-side: "Soul Power Pt. 2 & Pt. 3"
- Released: March 1971
- Recorded: January 26, 1971, Rodel Studios, Washington, D.C.
- Genre: Funk
- Length: 3:20 (Pt. 1); 2:40 (Pt. 2); 2:10 (Pt. 3); 12:05 (complete version)
- Label: King; 6368
- Songwriter: James Brown
- Producer: James Brown

James Brown charting singles chronology
"Spinning Wheel Pt. 1" (1971)	"Soul Power Pt. 1" (1971)	"I Cried" (1971)

Audio video
- "Soul Power (Complete Version / Mono)" on YouTube

"Soul Power" is a song by James Brown. Brown recorded it with the original J.B.'s (plus Fred Wesley) and it was released as a three-part single in 1971. Like "Get Up (I Feel Like Being a) Sex Machine" and other hits from this period it features backing vocals by Bobby Byrd. It charted #3 R&B and #29 Pop.

Part 1 of "Soul Power" appeared on the 1972 album Soul Classics. Live versions of the song were included on Revolution of the Mind (1971) and Love Power Peace (1992; recorded 1971), but no longer version of the original studio recording received an album release until an eight-minute re-edit was issued on the 1986 compilation album In the Jungle Groove. The complete studio recording, over 12 minutes long, appeared for the first time on the 1996 CD compilation Funk Power 1970: A Brand New Thang.

== Personnel ==
- James Brown - lead vocal

with The J.B.'s

- Bobby Byrd - organ, vocals
- Darryl "Hasaan" Jamison - trumpet
- Clayton "Chicken" Gunnells - trumpet
- Fred Wesley - trombone
- St. Clair Pinckney - tenor saxophone
- Phelps "Catfish" Collins - guitar
- Bobby Roach - guitar
- William "Bootsy" Collins - bass
- John "Jabo" Starks - drums
- Johnny Griggs - congas

== Soul Power 74 ==
"Soul Power 74 - Part I"

Single by Maceo and the Macks

from the album Us!
- B-side: "Soul Power 74 - Part II"
- Released: October 1973
- Recorded: January 26, 1971, Rodel Studios, Washington, D.C. (original "Soul Power"); September 27–28, 1973, Advantage Studios, New York, NY (overdubs)
- Genre: Funk
- Length: 3:00 (Part I); 4:07 (Part II)
- Label: People; 631
- Songwriter: James Brown
- Producer: James Brown

In 1974, Brown created an instrumental version of "Soul Power" by having Maceo Parker and Fred Wesley overdub new horn parts onto the rhythm track of the original recording. Sound engineer Bob Both added sound effects at several points to conceal where the original horn track had bled through into the rhythm parts. Titled "Soul Power 74" and credited to "Maceo and the Macks", the new version was released as a two-part single on People Records and charted #20 R&B and #109 Bubbling Under Pop. It also appeared on the album Us!.

== Cover versions and sampling ==
- Alternative rock band the Smashing Pumpkins covered "Soul Power" on their 2000 album Machina II/The Friends & Enemies of Modern Music.
- Rapper Chuck D performed it on his 2007 tribute album Tribb to JB.
- Soul band Tower of Power has performed "Soul Power" as an extended ending/jam to their popular hit "What Is Hip?".

Both the "Soul Power" and "Soul Power 74" have been extensively sampled in hip hop music and other genres. "Soul Power 74" was sampled on Redman's "Rated R", MC Breed and 2Pac's "Gotta Get Mine", Spoonie Gee's "The Godfather", Black Machine's "How Gee" and Usher's "Ride" (later re-made by Jennifer Lopez as "Get Right"), among many others.

== Appearances in other media ==
"Soul Power 74" is featured in the video game Grand Theft Auto: San Andreas on the radio station Master Sounds 98.3.
