= House Guests =

US musical group

- Origin: Cincinnati, Ohio, U.S.
- Genre: funk
- Label: House Guests
- Past members: Bootsy Collins; Catfish Collins; Clayton "Chicken" Gunnells; Robert McCullough; Frankie "Kash" Waddy

House Guests was an early-1970s American funk group that consisted of bassist William "Bootsy" Collins, his older brother Phelps "Catfish" Collins on guitar, Frank "Kash" Waddy on drums, Clayton "Chicken" Gunnells on trumpet, and Robert McCullough on saxophone.

House Guests was formed in 1971 after the Collins brothers left The J.B.'s, James Brown's band. The band released two singles on their own House Guests label in 1971, "What So Never The Dance" becoming a minor hit.

During 1971 several members of Funkadelic quit, and George Clinton invited the members of House Guests to join Funkadelic in their place. Their unique contributions to Funkadelic's sound can be heard on that band's 1972 release, America Eats Its Young.

In 1976 several members of House Guests became members of Bootsy's Rubber Band, Bootsy Collins' band within the P-Funk musical collective.

== Discography ==
- "What So Never The Dance" pt. 1 /"What So Never The Dance" pt. 2 (1971)
- "My Mind Set Me Free" pt. 1 / "My Mind Set Me Free" pt. 2 (1971)
