= I Cried (James Brown song) =

1963 single

Single by Tammy Montgomery
- B-side: "If You Don't Think"
- Released: April 1963
- Recorded: ca. February 1963, probably King Studios, Cincinnati, OH
- Genre: Rhythm and blues, soul
- Length: 2:50
- Label: Try Me; 28001
- Songwriters: James Brown; Bobby Byrd
- Producer: James Brown

Tammy Montgomery singles chronology
"Voice of Experience" (1962)	"I Cried" (1963)	"If I Would Marry You" (1964)

"I Cried"

Single by James Brown
- B-side: "World Pt. 2"
- Released: c. April 1971
- Recorded: 1971
- Genre: Soul
- Length: 3:31
- Label: King; 6363
- Songwriters: James Brown; Bobby Byrd
- Producer: James Brown

James Brown charting singles chronology
"Soul Power Pt. 1" (1971)	"I Cried" (1971)	"Escape-ism (Part 1)" (1971)

Audio video
- "I Cried" on YouTube

"I Cried" is a song written by James Brown and Bobby Byrd. It was originally recorded in 1963 by Tammy Montgomery, better known as Tammi Terrell, for Brown's Try Me Records. It was her first charting single, reaching #99 on the Billboard Hot 100.

== James Brown recording ==
James Brown reused the song's chord progression for his 1966 hit "It's a Man's Man's Man's World". He later recorded "I Cried" himself, released in April 1971 in a version arranged by Dave Matthews that charted #15 R&B and #50 Pop. It was his final single for King Records.

=== Chart performance ===
Chart (1971)	Peak position
US Billboard Hot 100	50
US Billboard Best Selling Soul Singles	15
