= Get Up Offa That Thing =

Single by James Brown

from the album Get Up Offa That Thing
- B-side: "Release the Pressure"
- Released: May 1976
- Recorded: April 1976
- Studio: Criteria Studios, Miami, Florida
- Genre: Funk; disco
- Length: 4:11 (Get Up Offa That Thing); 5:27 (Release the Pressure)
- Label: Polydor; 14326
- Songwriters: Deanna Brown; Deidre Brown; Yamma Brown
- Producer: James Brown

James Brown charting singles chronology
"(I Love You) For Sentimental Reasons" (1976)	"Get Up Offa That Thing" (1976)	"I Refuse to Lose" (1976)

Audio video
- "Get Up Offa That Thing (Release The Pressure)" on YouTube

"Get Up Offa That Thing" is a song written and performed by James Brown. It was released in 1976 as a two-part single (the B-side, titled "Release the Pressure", is a continuation of the same song). It reached #4 on the R&B chart, briefly returning Brown to the Top Ten after a year's absence, and #45 on the Billboard Hot 100. Thanks to its chart success, the song became Brown's biggest hit of the late 1970s. The song's lyrics urge listeners to "Get up offa that thing / and dance 'til you feel better." Due to his troubles with the IRS for failure to pay back taxes, Brown credited authorship of the song to his wife Deidre and their daughters, Deanna and Yamma Brown.

== Background ==
According to Brown, the inspiration for "Get Up Offa That Thing" came to him during a club performance in Fort Lauderdale:

The audience was sitting down, trying to do a sophisticated thing, listening to funk. One of the tightest bands they'd ever heard in their lives, and they were sitting. I had worked hard and dehydrated myself and was feeling depressed. I looked out at all those people sitting there, and because I was depressed they looked depressed. I yelled, "Get up offa that thing and dance til you feel better!" I probably meant until I felt better.

Unlike most popular music of the time, which made sophisticated use of multitrack recording and other techniques, "Get Up Offa That Thing" was recorded live in the studio in only two takes.

Brown re-recorded "Get Up Offa That Thing" for the Doctor Detroit soundtrack album. He also performs the song during his guest appearance in the film. Other performances of the song appear on the albums Hot on the One, Live in New York, Live at Chastain Park, and Live at the Apollo 1995.

== Credits and personnel ==
- James Brown – lead vocal

with The J.B.'s:

- Russell Crimes – trumpet
- Holly Ferris – trombone
- St. Clair Pinckney – tenor saxophone
- Peyton Johnson – tenor saxophone
- Joe Poff Jr. - alto saxophone
- Jimmy Nolen – guitar
- Robert Lee Coleman – guitar
- Charles Sherrell – clavinet
- Melvin Parker – drums
- Will Lee – bass

== Chart performance ==
Chart (1976)	Peak position
U.S. Billboard Hot 100	45
U.S. Billboard National Disco Top 40	19
U.S. Billboard Hot Soul Singles	4

== Certifications ==
Region	Certification	Certified units/sales
New Zealand (RMNZ)	Gold	15,000^{‡}
^{‡} Sales+streaming figures based on certification alone.

== Appearances in other media ==
- Miss America 2013 Mallory Hagan performed a tap dance to this song as her talent.
