= Eko Guitars =

Italian manufacturer of guitars

Eko Music Group
- Type: Private
- Founded: 1959
- Founder: Oliviero Pigini
- Headquarters: Recanati, Italy
- Area served: Worldwide
- Website: www.ekoguitars.it/en/

Eko is an Italian manufacturer of electric guitars, acoustic guitars and similar instruments, catering to professional level and manufacturing largely for export. It is located in Recanati, Marche.

== Products ==
=== Guitars ===
Their products include classical guitars, 12-string guitars, arch top guitars, electric guitars and acoustic bass guitars.

Eko gained high popularity during the rock 'n' roll craze of the 1960s, becoming the largest guitar exporter in Europe. Their electric models were often highly ornamented with pearl, featured 3 or 4 pickups and recognizable "rocker" switches for pickup selection. The acoustic models were popular in country and folk rock bands of the late 1960s. The best-known models of the 1960s include:

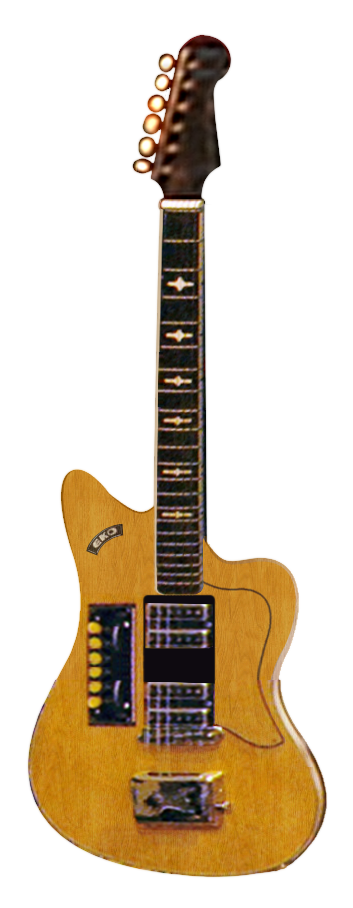
Eko 400-4V Ekomaster (1960–1962)

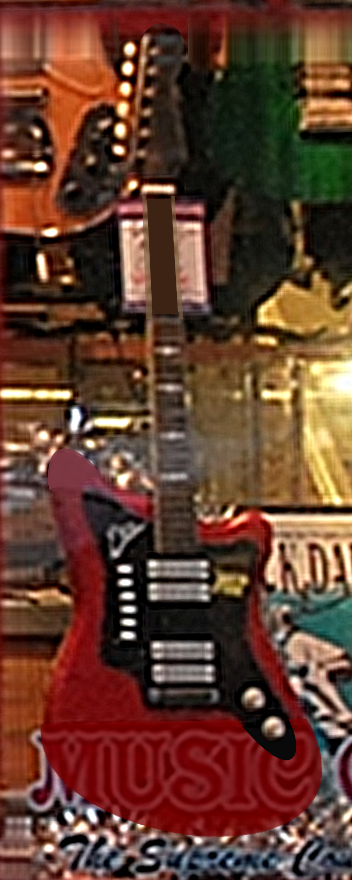
Eko 500 (1962–1965)

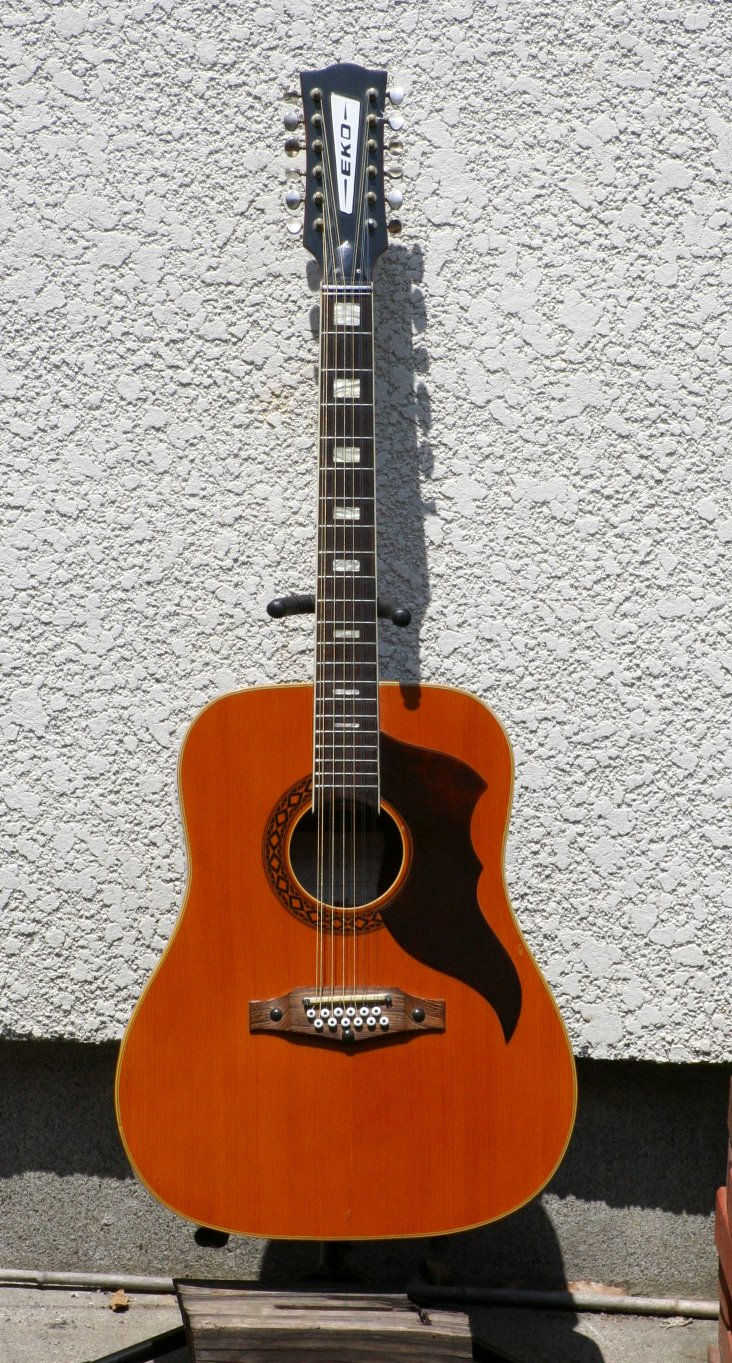
Eko Ranger 12 string

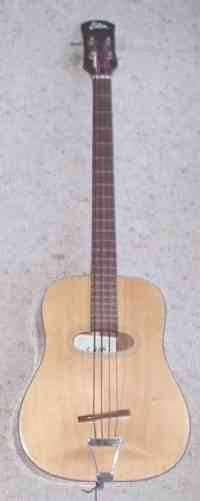
Eston bass, fretless but with markers (1980s)

- Eko 400 Ekomaster (Fender Jaguar shape with flat-top, Hagström-style control panel),
- Eko 500 (Fender Jaguar lookalike),
- Eko 700 (original triple-cutaway design with "hockey stick" head),
- Eko 290 (also known as Eko Barracuda, semi-hollow flat-top electric),
- Eko Rokes (rocket-shaped electric, made popular by an Italian pop band of the same name, The Rokes)
- Eko Kadett ('67 original double cutaway with characteristic long "horns") and
- Eko Ranger (the best-selling Eko product, acoustic in 6 and 12-string version).
- Eko 995 (violin bodied four string bass popular in the late 1960s)

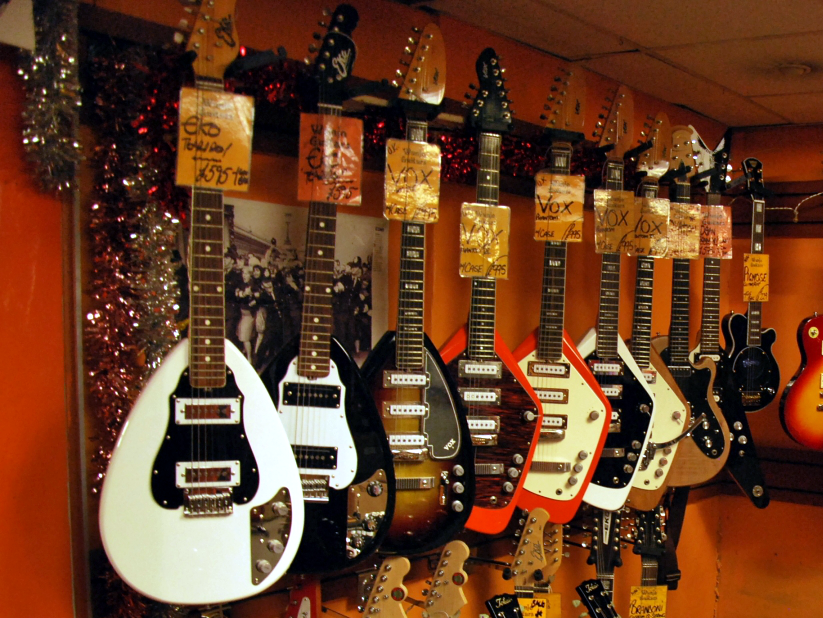
Eko teardrop, Vox Mark, and Vox Phantom (Wunjo Guitars, London)

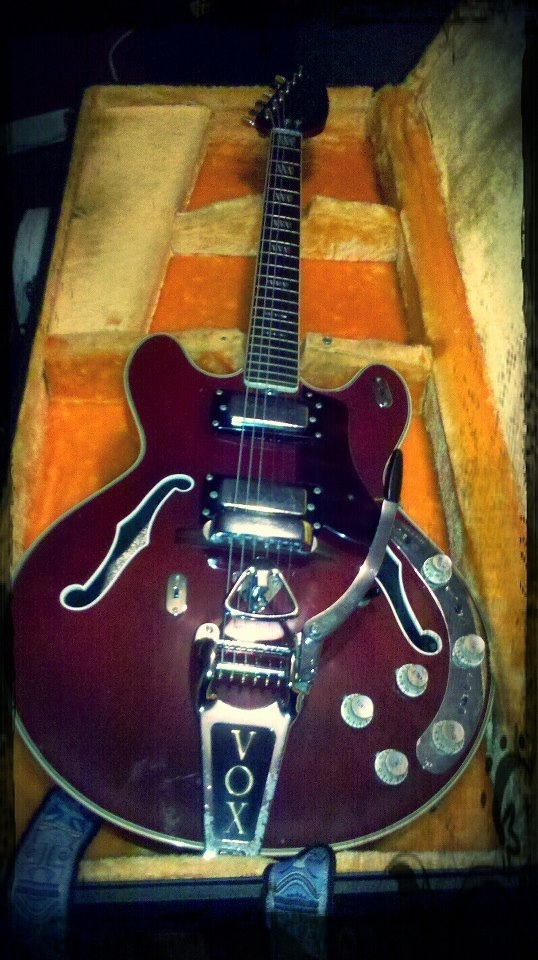
Vox Ultrasonic (1968)

Eko also produced guitars for Vox in the 1960s, in the US they were distributed through LoDuca brothers of Milwaukee, Wisconsin.

- Vox Mark III
- Vox Phantom
- Vox Ultrasonic

In the UK the instruments were imported by Rose-Morris, London.

In Australia their instruments were imported by Rose Music and often, but not always, branded with their house brand Eston.

Eko guitar has been manufacturing guitars since the early 1960s and continue to through present day.

As of 2015, Eko guitars were imported and distributed in the United States by Kelley Distribution of Fort Lauderdale, Florida.

=== Other musical instruments ===
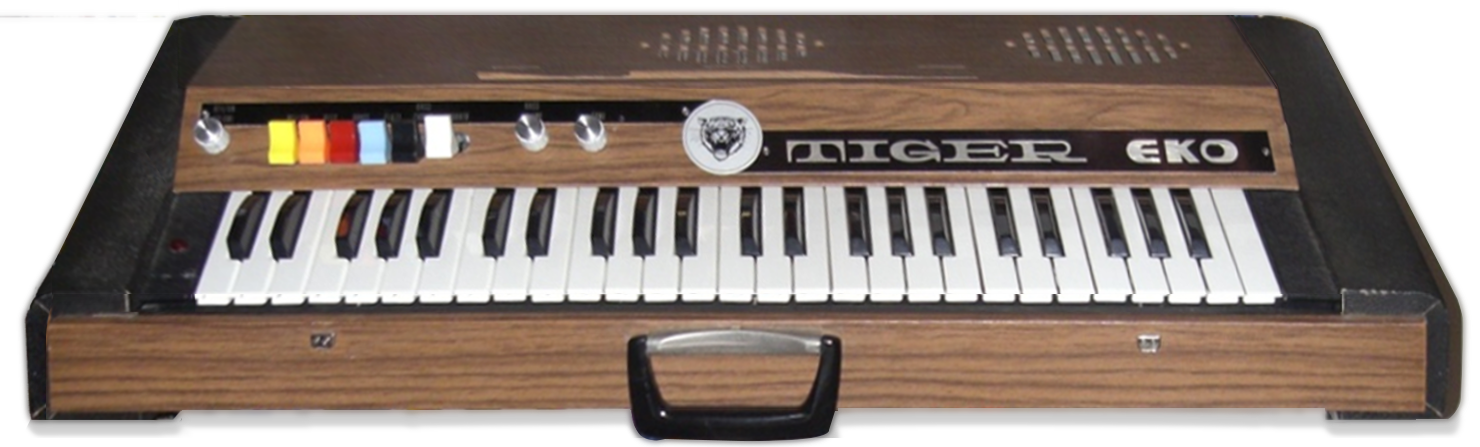
EKO Tiger combo organ

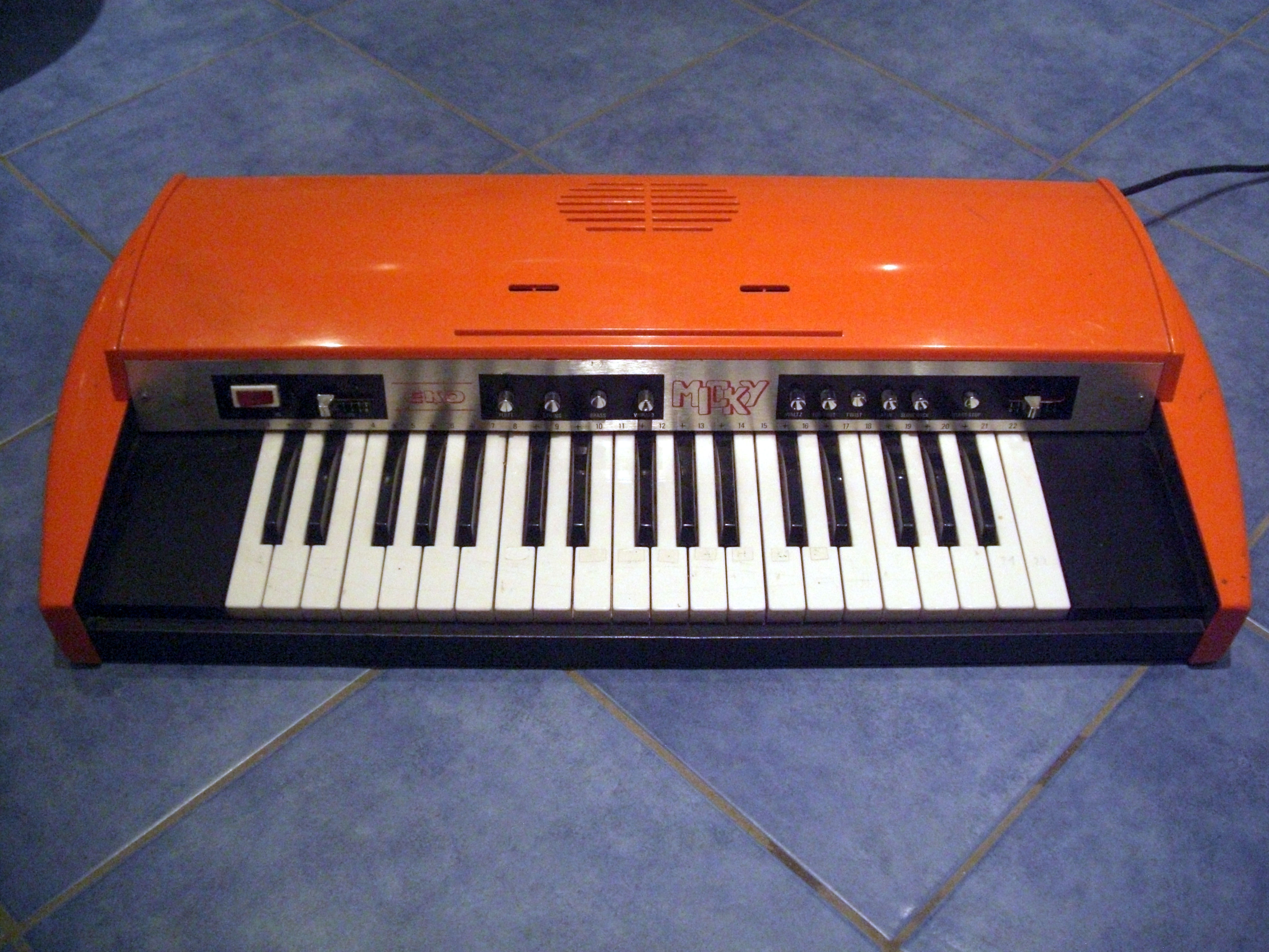
EKO Micky combo organ

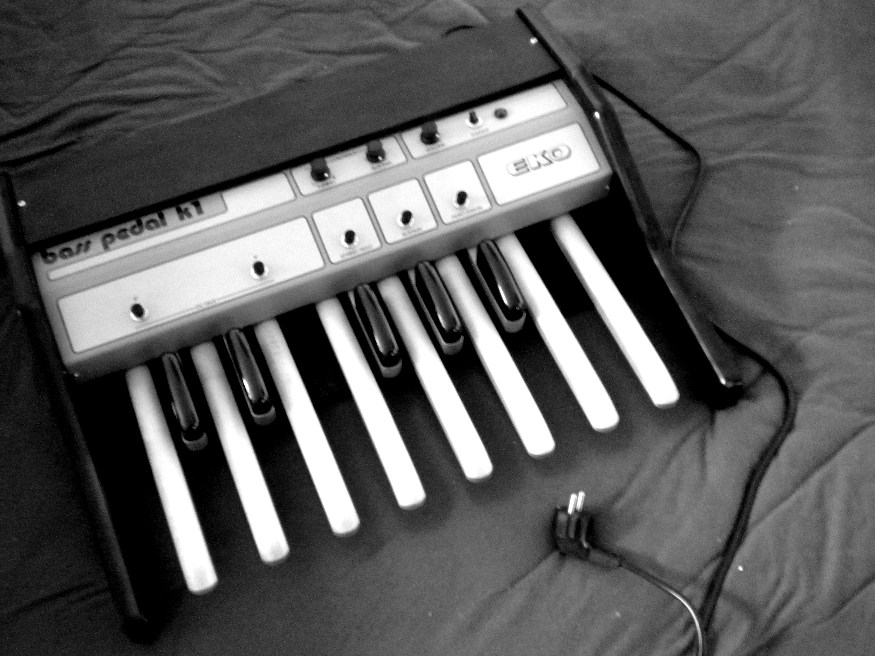
EKO Bass Pedal K1 (1970s)

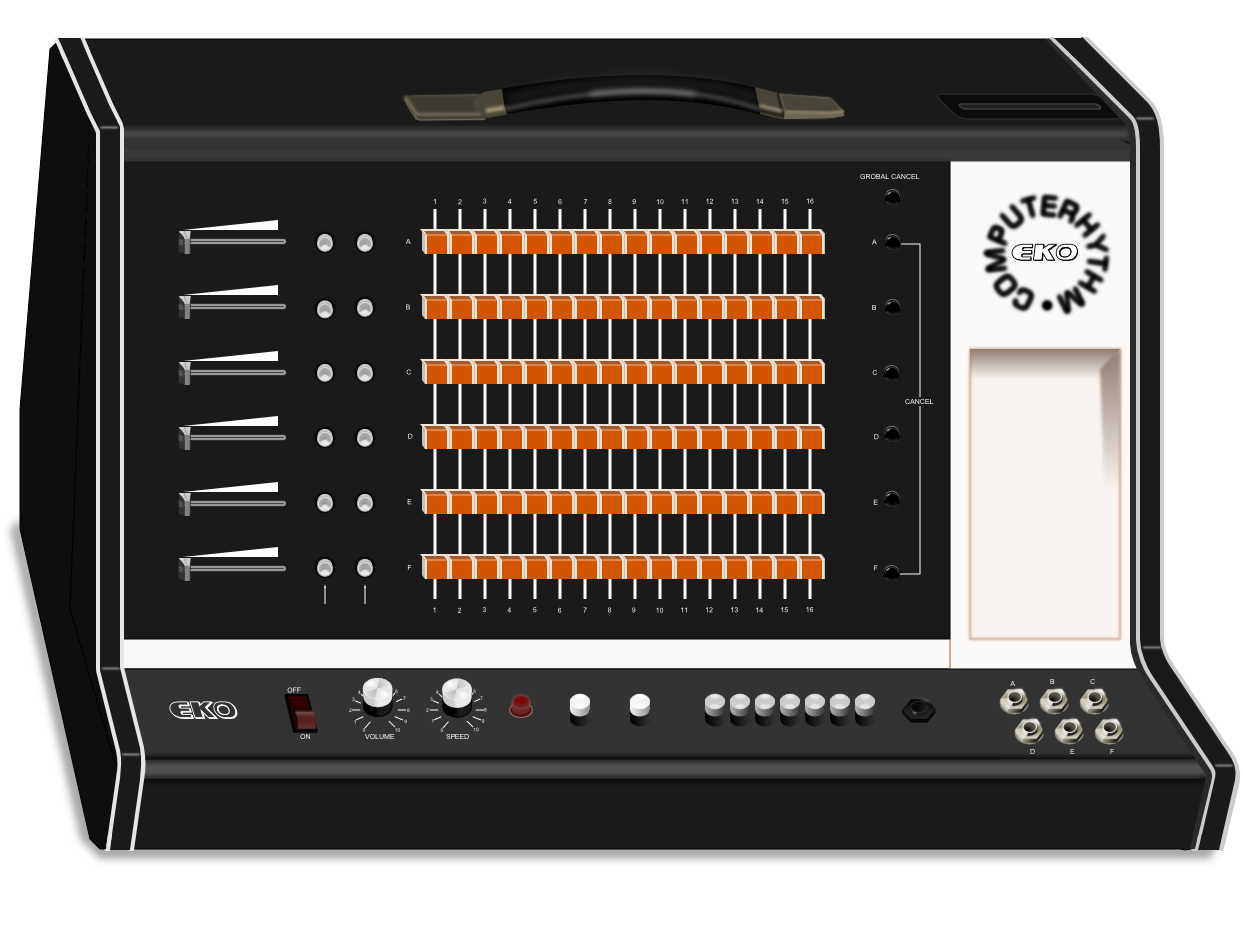
EKO ComputeRhythm (1972)

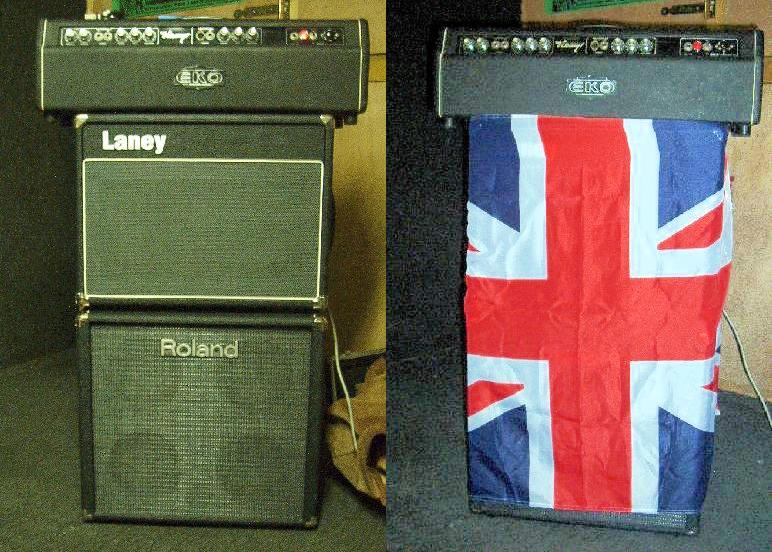
EKO Viscount amp head (top)

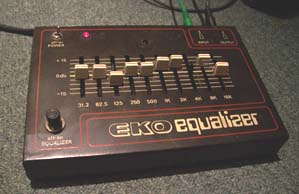
EKO equalizer 10-band graphic equalizer

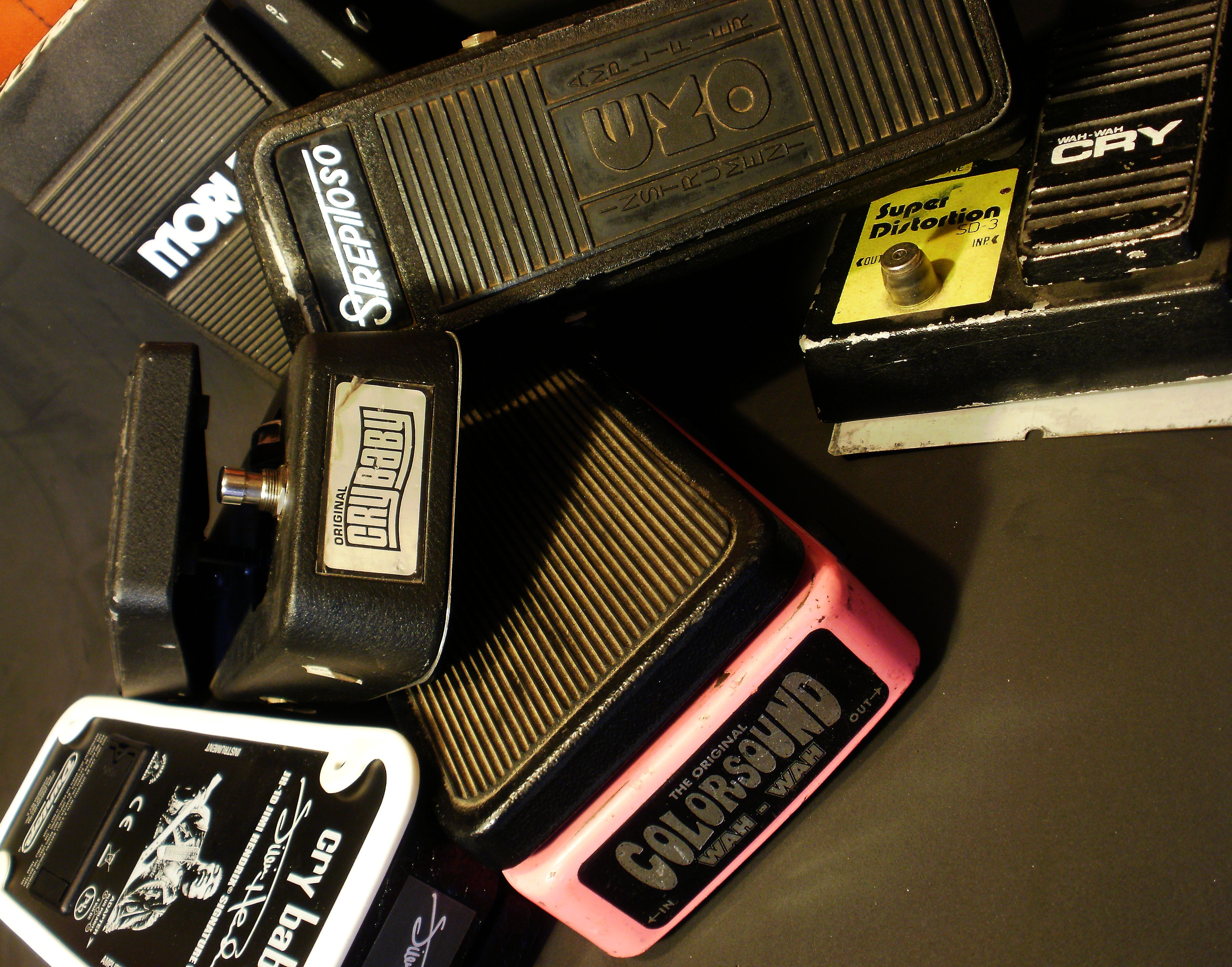
EKO Strepitoso wah pedal (top)

== See also ==
- List of Italian companies
- Vox (musical equipment)
