= Make It Funky – The Big Payback: 1971–1975 =

Compilation album by James Brown
- Released: July 23, 1996
- Recorded: 1971–1975
- Genre: Funk
- Length: 150:03
- Label: Polydor
- Producer: Various

James Brown chronology
Funk Power 1970 (1996)	Make It Funky – The Big Payback: 1971–1975 (1996)	JB40 – 40th Anniversary Collection (1996)

Professional ratings
Review scores
Source	Rating
AllMusic	4.5/5 stars

Make It Funky – The Big Payback: 1971–1975 is the fourth of several James Brown era overviews released by Polydor Records in 1996.

== Track listing ==
Disc 1

1. "Escape-ism" - 4:02
2. "Hot Pants, Parts 1 & 2" - 6:55
3. "I'm a Greedy Man" - 7:08
4. "Make It Funky, Parts 1, 2, 3 & 4" - 12:45
5. "King Heroin" - 3:55
6. "I Got Ants in My Pants (and I Want to Dance)" - 7:26
7. "There It Is" - 5:47
8. "Get On the Good Foot" - 5:44
9. "Don't Tell It" - 8:25
  - previously unreleased complete version
10. "I Got a Bag of My Own" - 3:46
11. "Down and Out in New York City" - 5:21
  - previously unreleased version with spoken intro
12. "Think '73" - 3:12
13. "Make It Good to Yourself" (interlude) - 2:19
  - previously unreleased version

Disc 2

1. "The Payback" - 7:39
2. "Stoned to the Bone" - 4:00
3. "Mind Power" - 4:08
  - previously unreleased alternate version
4. "World of Soul" - 5:44
  - previously unreleased
5. "Papa Don't Take No Mess" - 13:50
6. "Coldblooded" - 5:04
  - previously unreleased undubbed version
7. "I Can't Stand It "76"" - 8:11
8. "My Thang" - 4:15
9. "Funky President (People It's Bad)" - 4:08
  - previously unreleased original speed master
10. "I Feel Good" - 3:02
11. "Problems" - 2:50
12. "Turn On the Heat and Build Some Fire" - 6:07
13. "Hot Pants Finale" (Live) - 7:20
  - previously unreleased version
