= Star Generation =

Single by James Brown

from the album The Original Disco Man
- B-side: "Women Are Something Else"
- Released: August 1979
- Genre: Funk, disco
- Length: 4:21
- Label: Polydor
- Songwriters: Brad Shapiro; Randy McCormick
- Producer: Brad Shapiro

James Brown charting singles chronology
"It's Too Funky in Here" (1979)	"Star Generation" (1979)	"Regrets" (1979)

Audio video
- "Star Generation" on YouTube

"Star Generation" is a song recorded by James Brown. It was released as a single in 1979 and charted #63 R&B. It also appeared on the album The Original Disco Man.
