= The Original Disco Man =

Studio album by James Brown
- Released: June 1979
- Recorded: March 5 – April 1979
- Studio: Muscle Shoals (Sheffield, Alabama); The Soundshop (Nashville, Tennessee)
- Genre: Funk; disco
- Length: 43:52
- Label: Polydor; 6212
- Producer: Brad Shapiro, James Brown ("Love Me Tender")

James Brown chronology
Take a Look at Those Cakes (1978)	The Original Disco Man (1979)	People (1980)

Singles from The Original Disco Man
- 1. "It's Too Funky in Here" Released: May 1979; 2. "Star Generation / Women Are Something Else" Released: August 1979

The Original Disco Man is a studio album by the American musician James Brown. It was released in June of 1979 by Polydor Records. The front cover photograph was taken by Joel Bernstein. Brown supported the album with a North American tour.

== Critical reception ==
Professional ratings
Review scores
Source	Rating
AllMusic	4/5 stars
(The New) Rolling Stone Album Guide	3/5 stars
Smash Hits	8/10
The Village Voice	A−
The Virgin Encyclopedia of R&B and Soul	3/5 stars

The New York Times wrote that "the performances aren't really up to the fevered level of his great days."

== Track listing ==
All tracks are written by Brad Shapiro and Randy McCormick; except where indicated.

No.	Title	Writer(s)	Length
1.	"It's Too Funky in Here"	Brad Shapiro, George Jackson, Robert Alton Miller, Walter N. Shaw	6:32
2.	"Let the Boogie Do the Rest"		7:22
3.	"Still"	Bill Anderson	6:04
4.	"Star Generation"		8:07
5.	"Women Are Something Else"		5:59
6.	"The Original Disco Man"	Brad Shapiro	6:58
7.	"Love Me Tender" (CD bonus track)	Elvis Presley, Vera Matson	2:47

== Personnel ==
- James Brown – lead vocals
- Cynthia Douglas, Donna Davis, Pamela Vincent – backing vocals
- Ben Cauley, Harrison Calloway Jr. – trumpet
- Charles Rose – trombone
- Harvey Thompson – tenor saxophone
- Ronnie Eades – baritone saxophone
- Clayton Ivey, Randy McCormick – keyboards
- Jimmy Johnson, Larry Byrom – electric guitar
- David Hood – bass guitar
- Roger Hawkins – drums
