= Escape-ism =

"Escape-ism (Part 1)"

Single by James Brown

from the album Hot Pants
- B-side: "Escape-ism (Part 2 & 3)"
- Released: 1971
- Genre: Funk, proto-rap
- Length: 3:14 (Part 1); 4:00 (Part 2 & 3); 19:09 (Full Version)
- Label: People; 2500
- Songwriter: James Brown
- Producer: James Brown

James Brown charting singles chronology
"I Cried" (1971)	"Escape-ism (Part 1)" (1971)	"Hot Pants Pt. 1 (She Got to Use What She Got to Get What She Wants)" (1971)

Audio video
- "Escape-Ism (Pt. 1)" on YouTube

"Escape-ism" is a funk song by American musician James Brown. It was Brown's first release on his own label, People Records. It charted at #6 on the Billboard R&B chart and #35 on the Billboard Hot 100 as a two-part single in 1971. Both parts also appeared on the album Hot Pants in 1971, with the previously unreleased nineteen-minute unedited take of the track appearing on the album's 1992 CD re-release. According to Robert Christgau the song was "supposedly cut to kill time until Bobby Byrd arrived" at the studio. A live version of "Escape-ism" is included on Brown's 1971 live album Revolution of the Mind. The song was sampled in Bell Biv Devoe's song "Poison" from their 1990 album of the same name.
