= I Got a Bag of My Own =

Single by James Brown

from the album Get on the Good Foot
- B-side: "Public Enemy #1 - Part 1"
- Released: November 1972
- Recorded: September 19, 1972, A&R Studios, New York, NY
- Genre: Funk
- Length: 3:46
- Label: Polydor; 14153
- Songwriter(s): James Brown
- Producer(s): James Brown

James Brown charting singles chronology
"Get on the Good Foot - Part 1" (1972)	"I Got a Bag of My Own" (1972)	"What My Baby Needs Now Is a Little More Lovin'" (1972)

Audio video
- "I Got A Bag Of My Own" on YouTube

"I Got a Bag of My Own" is a funk song by James Brown. It features an arrangement by Dave Matthews. Released as a single in 1972, it charted #3 R&B and #44 Pop. It also appeared on the album Get on the Good Foot.
