= What My Baby Needs Now Is a Little More Lovin' =

Single by James Brown & Lyn Collins
- B-side: "This Guy - This Girl's in Love"
- Released: December 1972
- Genre: Soul
- Length: 2:54
- Label: Polydor; 14157
- Songwriter(s): James Brown; Lyn Collins; Dave Matthews
- Producer(s): James Brown

James Brown charting singles chronology
"I Got a Bag of My Own" (1972)	"What My Baby Needs Now Is a Little More Lovin'" (1972)	"I Got Ants in My Pants - Part 1" (1973)

Audio video
- "What My Baby Needs Now Is A Little More Lovin'" on YouTube

"What My Baby Needs Is a Little More Lovin'" is a song recorded as a duet between James Brown and Lyn Collins. Released as a single in December 1972, it charted #17 R&B and #56 Pop. The song was arranged by Fred Wesley and Dave Matthews.
