= Vox Mark III =

Electric guitar made by Vox

- Manufacturer: Vox
- Period: 1963 - 1967, 1998 - present

Construction
- Body type: Solid
- Neck joint: Bolt on
- Scale: 25.5"

Woods
- Body: Maple, Ash
- Neck: Maple
- Fretboard: Rosewood

Hardware
- Bridge: Adjustable Tune-o-matic bridge
- Pickup: 2 or 3 single-coil pickups

Colors available
- Black, white, green, light blue, red - custom colors also made in smaller numbers

The Mark is an electric guitar made by Vox. The instrument is also known as the Vox Teardrop, but this is not the official name. The Vox Mark came in three variations, a 6 string (the Mark VI), a 9 string (the Mark IX) and a 12 string (the Mark XII)

== History ==
In 1962, Vox introduced the pentagonal Phantom guitar, originally made in Kent, England but soon after made by EKO of Italy. It was followed a year later by the teardrop-shaped Mark VI, the prototype of which was made specifically for Brian Jones of The Rolling Stones, using a non-tremolo Fender Stratocaster bridge.

The Mark VI was released in three versions, as a 6-string, a 9-string, and a 12-string. The 9-string had three wound strings and three pairs of unwound strings.

The Phantom guitar received an international prize for best design when it was released.

Even though Vox discontinued the production of these guitars in the seventies, accurate copies of the Teardrop and other Vox models are still manufactured by Jack Charles of Phantom Guitarworks.

In the late 1990s, Vox reissued USA manufactured versions of the Phantom, Mark III Teardrops and Mando Guitars. The USA made guitars are considered by many to be the most playable versions of these instruments ever made.

To celebrate their 50th Anniversary in 2007, Vox commissioned a limited run of 100 pcs to be USA manufactured, Mark III, 2 pickup, fixed bridge, antique white "Teardrops"

For 2011, Vox has reintroduced the iconic droplet body shape in its new APACHE Series. These travel guitars feature the original styling and host a 2-channel guitar amplifier, 2 speakers, dozens of rhythm patterns, and an E-String tuner, all of which are built into the instrument body.

== Mark VI ==
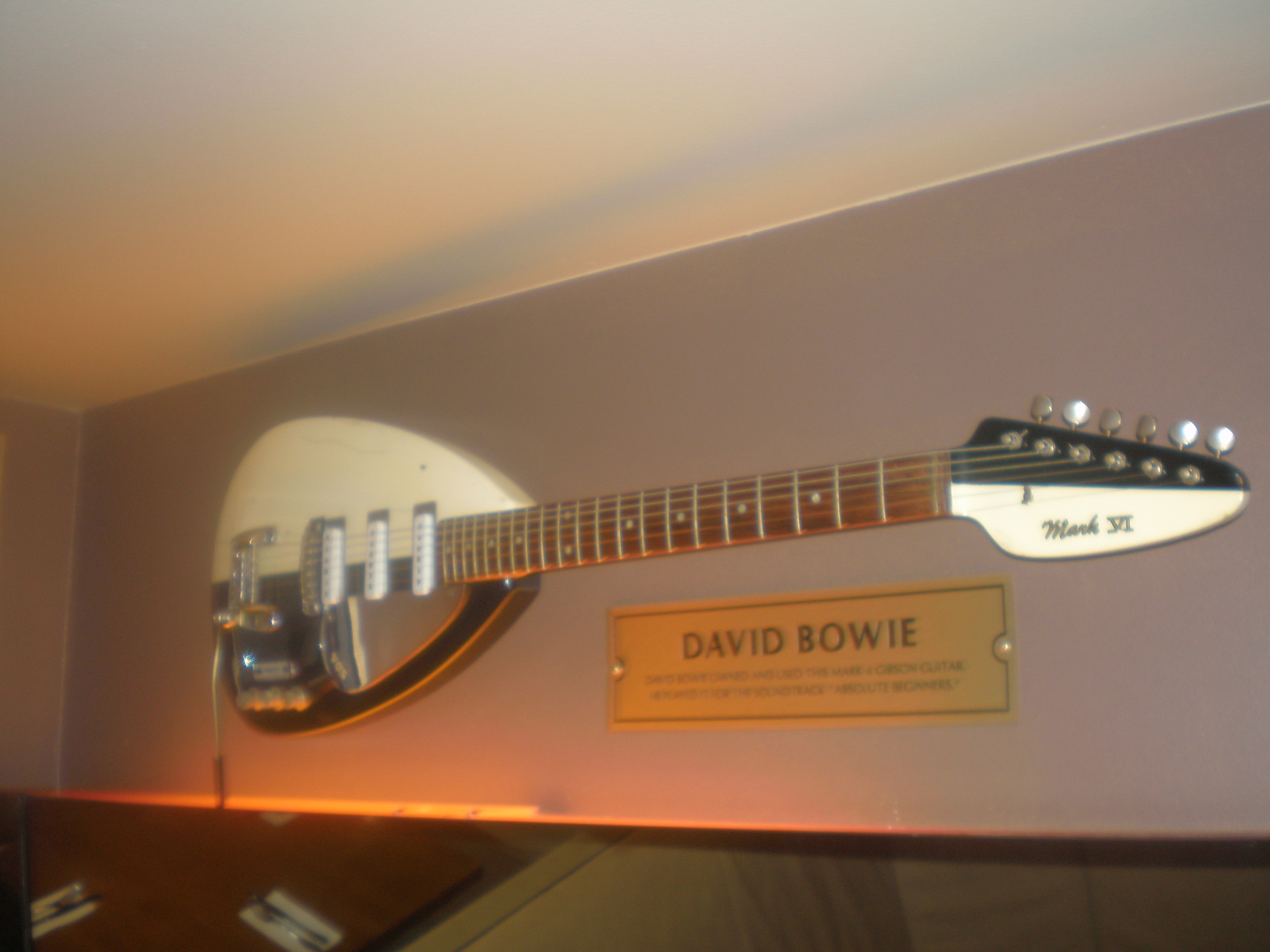
David Bowie's Vox guitar, located in Hard Rock Café Warsaw

The Mark VI had 6 strings, the Mark IX had 9, the Mark XII had 12.

== Mark XII ==
In the mid 1960s, as the sound of electric 12-string guitars became popular, Vox introduced the Phantom XII and Mark XII electric 12-string guitars as well as the Tempest XII, also made in Italy, which featured a more conventional body style. Vox produced a number of other models of 6 and 12 string electric guitars in both England and Italy. Guitar effects pedals, including an early version of the wah-wah, used by Jimi Hendrix, and the Tone Bender fuzzbox pedal, used by Jimmy Page of the Yardbirds, were also manufactured.

== Vox Phantom ==
In 1962 Vox also introduced the pentagonal Vox Phantom guitar, originally made in England but soon after made by EKO of Italy, the Mark V (5). This guitar can be seen in Joy Division's video Love Will Tear Us Apart. This is not a Mark III or VI.
