= It's Too Funky in Here =

"It's Too Funky in Here""

Single by James Brown

from the album The Original Disco Man
- B-side: "Are We Really Dancing?"
- Released: May 1979
- Recorded: March 5, 1979, Muscle Shoals Sound Studio, Muscle Shoals, AL; March 13, 1979, The Sound Shop, Nashville, TN (vocals)
- Genre: Disco, funk
- Length: 3:58
- Label: Polydor; 14557
- Songwriters: George Jackson; Walter Shaw; Brad Shapiro; Robert Miller
- Producer: Brad Shapiro

James Brown singles chronology
"For Goodness Sakes, Look at Those Cakes (Part 1)" (1978)	"It's Too Funky in Here"" (1979)	"Star Generation" (1979)

Audio video
- "It's Too Funky In Here" on YouTube

"It's Too Funky in Here" is a song recorded by James Brown. Released as a single in May 1979, it charted #15 R&B. It also appeared on the album The Original Disco Man. Critic Robert Christgau praised the song as the "disco disc of the year".

Live performances of the song appear on the albums Hot On the One, Live in New York, and Live at Chastain Park.
