= Vox Phantom =

Electric guitar model

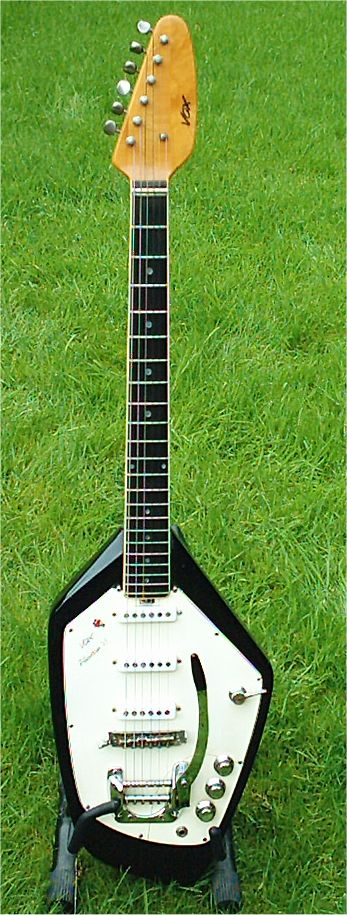
- Phantom VI in black, with tremolo tailpiece
- Manufacturer: Vox
- Period: 1963–1967, 1998–present

Construction
- Body type: Solid
- Neck joint: Bolt on
- Scale: 25.5"

Woods
- Body: Maple, Ash
- Neck: Maple
- Fretboard: Rosewood

Hardware
- Bridge: Adjustable Tune-o-matic bridge
- Pickup: Two or three single-coil pickups

Colors available
- Black, white, green, light blue, red; custom colors also made in smaller numbers

The Vox Phantom is an electric guitar, originally released in 1961 by the Jennings company. It is unique for its distinctive, pentagonal shape, which became part of the iconic representation of the British Invasion. Originally made in England, manufacturing was later relocated to Italy.

== History ==
The Vox Phantom Mark I introducing the unique asymmetrical coffin shape was introduced in October 1961. Compared to later Phantom models, it had a larger headstock and different vibrato system, as well as metal pickup covers. After being hand-built in Dartford for two years, it was re-designed in 1963 for mass production.

Features of the Vox Phantom included 2 or 3 single-coil pickups, open-back tuners, and a Tune-o-matic bridge inspired by similar Gibson bridges. Later models included a Bigsby-inspired tremolo, designed by Vox's founder, Thomas Jennings. It included a round leather-coated pad on the back for comfort while playing. A 12-string version, the Phantom XII, was also made. Both 6- and 12-string guitars were also made as "Stereo" versions, capable of operating in stereo with a special cable which connected to two amplifiers simultaneously. This enabled complex panning and switching effects that were in vogue because Psychedelic rock was popular at the time.

Another variant of the Phantom guitar was the rare "Special", built in the UK then later in Italy, a white version being famously used by Ian Curtis in Joy Division's "Love Will Tear Us Apart" video. The Special included on-board effects such as fuzz, tremolo, and repeat percussion. Effects were operated by a series of push buttons along the bottom neck side of the pick guard, with knobs to control vibrato and repeat speed. The Special also had a built-in 'E' tuner, which could be used to create a drone effect.

Introduced in 1967, the "Vox V261 Delta" 6-string guitar shared the same body shape as the Phantom, but employed several 9-volt on-board effects, including an E tuner, distortion booster, treble and bass boosters and a repeat percussion effect. Instead of three single coil pickups, the Delta was fitted with two Vox Ferro-Sonic high output, wide range pickups, with rectangular black plastic surrounds. The headstock had a black finish and the VOX logo was inlaid in mother of pearl. The Delta came complete with a Bigsby-style tremolo as well. Only available in white, V261 Deltas were made for Vox in Italy by Eko. A bass version was also produced, with two Ferro-Sonic pickups. It is believed that the Delta was only available in 1967 and 1968.

The guitar shared many of the practical problems of similar unusually-shaped guitars, such as Gibson's Flying V. Its shape made it difficult to play sitting down, and its polyester finish scratched easily at its corners.

Numerous copies of the Vox Phantom's distinctive five-sided body design were manufactured, by companies such as Teisco and Kawai, under the Domino brand name. Contemporary copies are also manufactured by companies such as Eastwood Guitars (called the VG6) and Jay Turser (called the Phantasia). Jack Charles, of the US firm Phantom Guitarworks, continues to build replicas of the Phantom and other VOX models.

In the late 1990s, VOX reissued USA-built versions of the Phantom, Mark III Teardrop and Mando guitars. The USA models are considered to be the most playable versions of the instruments ever made according to The Ultimate Guitar Book by Tony Bacon.

In 2011, VOX reintroduced the original pentagonal body shape in its Apache series. The travel guitar hosts a two-channel guitar amplifier, speakers, several rhythm patterns, and an E-String tuner.
