= Superbad (soundtrack) =

Superbad - Original Motion Picture Soundtrack

Soundtrack album by various artists
- Released: August 7, 2007
- Genre: Funk
- Length: 52:47
- Label: Lakeshore

Professional ratings
Review scores
| Source | Rating |
|---|---|
| Allmusic | 3/5 stars |
| Empire | 4/5 stars |

Superbad is the soundtrack to the 2007 film of the same name. It was released on August 7, 2007, on Lakeshore Records. The album features original music by Lyle Workman and Bootsy Collins, performed by a reunion of the original JBs rhythm section with Bootsy and Phelps Collins, Clyde Stubblefield, and Jabo Starks, and supplemented by Bernie Worrell. Also featured are songs by artists such as Curtis Mayfield and Rick James.

== Track listing ==
| No. | Title | Artist(s) | Length |
|---|---|---|---|
| 1. | "Super What?" | Lyle Workman | 4:06 |
| 2. | "Too Hot to Stop" | The Bar-Kays | 3:29 |
| 3. | "Seth Pulls Into Lot" | Lyle Workman | 2:38 |
| 4. | "Cops See Fogell's ID/Seth Saves Evan" | Lyle Workman | 1:46 |
| 5. | "Do Me" | Jean Knight | 2:51 |
| 6. | "Flashback Party Weekend" | Lyle Workman | 3:30 |
| 7. | "P.S. I Love You" | Curtis Mayfield | 3:56 |
| 8. | "Evan Runs" | Lyle Workman | 1:47 |
| 9. | "Sleeping Bags" | Lyle Workman | 3:26 |
| 10. | "Like A Pimp" | Lyle Workman | 2:05 |
| 11. | "Here I Come" | The Roots feat. Malik B. & Dice Raw | 4:12 |
| 12. | "Seth Runs on Track" | Lyle Workman | 1:09 |
| 13. | "Bustin' Out (On Funk)" | Rick James | 5:20 |
| 14. | "Evan's Basement Jam" | Lyle Workman | 3:33 |
| 15. | "Roda" | Sérgio Mendes & Brasil '66 | 2:24 |
| 16. | "Goldslick/Seth Fantasy" | Lyle Workman | 0:54 |
| 17. | "Soul Finger" | The Bar-Kays | 2:19 |
| 18. | "Funk McLovin" | Lyle Workman | 3:22 |

Walmart Bonus CD
| No. | Title | Artist(s) | Length |
|---|---|---|---|
| 1. | "These Eyes" | The Guess Who |
| 2. | "Glimpse of Those Warlocks" | Lyle Workman |
| 3. | "Stranglehold" | Ted Nugent |
| 4. | "Why Do I Cry" | The Remains |
| 5. | "Bar Fight" | Lyle Workman |
| 6. | "Pork and Beef" | The Coup |
| 7. | "Baby Please Don't Go" | The Amboy Dukes |
| 8. | "Cops Exit Liquor Store" | Lyle Workman |

== Tracks that appeared in the movie but not on the soundtrack album ==
- "Journey to the Center of the Mind" by The Amboy Dukes
- "Ace of Spades" by Motörhead
- "I'm Your Boogie Man" by KC and the Sunshine Band
- "Panama" by Van Halen
- "Are You Man Enough" by The Four Tops
- "Big Poppa" by The Notorious B.I.G.
- "Echoes" by The Rapture
- "Pork and Beef" by The Coup
- "Chop Chop You're Dead" by Cities In Dust
- "These Eyes" by The Guess Who (Performed by Michael Cera, and briefly heard when cops drive by)
- "This Is Yr Captain" by C'Mon
