= The Pacemakers (funk band) =

American funk band

- Origin: Cincinnati, Ohio, U.S.
- Genres: Funk
- Past members: Bootsy Collins; Catfish Collins; Will Jackson; Philippé Wynne; Frankie "Kash" Waddy

The Pacemakers were a late-1960s American funk group that consisted of bassist William "Bootsy" Collins, his older brother Phelps "Catfish" Collins on guitar, Philippé Wynne on vocals, and drummer Will Jackson (later replaced by Frankie "Kash" Waddy).

The Pacemakers were little-known outside Cincinnati, Ohio, until 1969. After most of James Brown's band quit over a pay dispute, The Pacemakers were hired in 1970 as replacements. They formed the cornerstone of Brown's new backup band, The J.B.'s.
