= Fred Thomas (bassist) =

American bassist

- Origin: Georgia, U.S.
- Genres: R&B, soul, funk
- Occupation: Musician
- Instruments: Bass guitar, vocals
- Years active: 1965–present
- Website: fredthomasofthejbs.com

Fred Thomas is an American bassist best known for his work with James Brown for more than thirty years. He performed on many of Brown's funk and R&B hits of the 1970s. More recent works by Thomas include three singles released in 2024 as a solo artist, and his recordings with The J.B.'s in 2018.

== Career ==
Thomas grew up in the US state of Georgia. He moved to New York City in 1965 and co-founded his own band with guitarist Hearlon "Cheese" Martin. Thomas was the bassist as well as lead vocalist of the group. He said: "I did my own thing, which is to keep a nice bottom in the pocket. I never bothered with any fancy stuff because I always did the singing in my bands, and you can't be fancy and sing."

In 1971, James Brown saw the band at Smalls Paradise club in Harlem. Brown was in search of new musicians for his own band, and after an impromptu performance with the band he decided to hire the whole group. Thomas said his band used to cover Brown's songs and that joining Brown was a smooth transition for them. He recorded on Brown's releases during 1970s. The first album titled, Hot Pants, was in 1971. Thomas also recorded on releases by The J.B.'s. Many of these recordings were later sampled in hip-hop music, such as "Pass the Peas", "Gimme Some More", and "Escape-ism".

Thomas performed with Brown for more than thirty years, longer than other bassists in that position. He recorded on several R&B number-one hits, including "Hot Pants", "Make It Funky", and "Papa Don't Take No Mess". In a 2005 interview, he expressed satisfaction with his work, stating: "I've been involved in one of the biggest, most legendary acts in the world. It's gone on for a long time – 33 years, on and off – and I feel good about the musicians I've played with."

After Brown's death in 2006, Thomas transitioned back to fronting his own group and collaborating with various bands. His later recordings are with Naomi Shelton & the Gospel Queens in 2014 and The J.B.'s in 2018. He released three singles in 2024 as a solo artist on Curtis E Records, which were titled "Living in New York City", "Nothing's Gonna Change (My Love for You)" and "For a Lick and a Promise".

== Discography ==
Credits adapted in part from AllMusic.

As solo artist

- "Living in New York City" (2024)
- "Nothing's Gonna Change (My Love for You)" (2024)
- "For a Lick and a Promise" (2024)

With James Brown

- Revolution of the Mind (1971)
- Hot Pants (1971)
- Get on the Good Foot (1972)
- The Payback (1973)
- Hell (1974)

With The J.B.'s

- Food for Thought (1972)
- Doing It to Death (1973)
- Funky Good Time: The Anthology (1995)
- Pass the Peas: The Best of the J.B.'s (2000) (Note: Per liner-notes by Alan Leeds, Thomas performed on: "Doing It to Death", "Hot Pants Road", "Pass the Peas", "Gimme Some More", "Givin' Up Food for Funk", "Same Beat", "Damn Right I Am Somebody", "Breakin' Bread", "(It's Not the Express) It's the J.B.'s Monaurail", "If You Don't Get It the First Time...".)
- Bring the Funk on Down (2002)
- The Lost Album (2011)
- We Came to Play (2018)

With Culture

- Good Things (1989)

With Naomi Shelton & the Gospel Queens

- Cold World (2014)
