= Doing It to Death =

Single by Fred Wesley & The J.B.'s

from the album Doing It to Death
- B-side: "Everybody Got Soul"
- Released: April 1973
- Recorded: January 29, 1973, International Studios, Augusta, GA
- Genre: Funk
- Length: 5:05; 10:01 (album version)
- Label: People; 621
- Songwriter: James Brown
- Producer: James Brown

Fred Wesley & The J.B.'s singles chronology
"Sportin' Life" (1973)	"Doing It to Death" (1973)	"If You Don't Get It the First Time, Back Up and Try It Again, Party" (1973)

Audio video
- "Doing It To Death (Pts. 1 & 2)" on YouTube

"Doing It to Death", also known as "Gonna Have a Funky Good Time", is a funk song recorded by The J.B.'s featuring James Brown. A 10-minute, two-part version of "Doing It to Death" was included on a J.B.'s album of the same name. The complete, unedited and nearly 13-minute-long original recording of the song was first issued on the 1995 J.B.'s compilation Funky Good Time: The Anthology. Performances of the song also appear on the albums Live at Chastain Park and Live at the Apollo 1995.

== Background ==
Although the song was written by Brown and featured him on lead vocals, the recording is credited to "Fred Wesley & The J.B.'s". It was the first J.B.'s recording to feature saxophonist Maceo Parker, who had returned to work with Brown again after attempting a career as a bandleader.

"Doing It to Death" contains an uncommon key change in which Brown tells the band to modulate downward from F to D ("In order for me to get down, I have to get down in D"). Composers who place key changes in tunes typically have them modulate upwards. Unusually for a James Brown song, the actual words "doing it to death" appear nowhere in the song's lyrics, which feature the hook "we're gonna have a funky good time." The title came from a figure of speech Brown heard Wesley use.

== Personnel ==
- James Brown - lead vocal

with Fred Wesley & The J.B.'s:

- Fred Wesley - trombone
- Darryl "Hasaan" Jamison - trumpet
- Jerone "Jasaan" Sanford - trumpet
- Ike Oakley - trumpet
- Maceo Parker - alto saxophone and flute
- St. Clair Pinckney - tenor saxophone
- Eldee Williams - tenor saxophone
- Jimmy Nolen - guitar
- Hearlon "Cheese" Martin - guitar
- Fred Thomas - bass
- John "Jabo" Starks - drums

== Chart performance ==
"Doing It to Death" was released as a single in 1973 and peaked at number 1 on the soul singles chart and number 22 on the Hot 100.
