= Catfish Collins =

American guitarist

Phelps "Catfish" Collins (October 17, 1943 – August 6, 2010) was an American musician. A lead guitarist and rhythm guitarist, he is known mostly for his work in the P-Funk collective. Although frequently overshadowed by his younger brother, Bootsy Collins, Catfish played on many important and influential records by James Brown, Parliament, Funkadelic, and Bootsy's Rubber Band.

== Early life ==
Phelps Collins was raised in Cincinnati, Ohio. He was the elder brother of William "Bootsy" Collins, whom he encouraged musically from a young age. It was Bootsy who nicknamed Phelps "Catfish" because Bootsy thought he looked like a catfish.

== Career ==
In 1968, the Collins brothers, along with Kash Waddy and Philippé Wynne, formed a group called The Pacemakers. Later the Pacemakers were hired by James Brown to accompany his vocals, at this they became known as The J.B.'s. Some of Brown's previous band members had walked out because of money disputes.

During their tenure in the J.B.'s, they recorded such classics as "Super Bad", "Get Up (I Feel Like Being a) Sex Machine", "Soul Power" and "Give It Up or Turnit a Loose". By 1971, Collins and the rest of the J.B.'s had quit James Brown.

The Collins brothers and Kash Waddy formed House Guests and shortly after joined Funkadelic and contributed to the Funkadelic album America Eats Its Young. On Catfish's early work with James Brown and Funkadelic, Catfish played a Vox Ultrasonic guitar with built-in effects. Some of his most famous playing can be heard on the Parliament hit single "Flash Light". Four years later, Collins joined Bootsy's Rubber Band, which included Waddy, Joel "Razor Sharp" Johnson (keyboards), Gary "Muddbone" Cooper (vocals) and Robert "P-Nut" Johnson (vocals), along with The Horny Horns.

Collins played on albums by Freekbass and H-Bomb. In 1990, he performed on Deee-Lite's biggest hit "Groove Is in the Heart". In 2007, he contributed guitar work to the Superbad movie soundtrack.

== Personal life ==
He died on August 6, 2010, in Cincinnati after a long battle with cancer. He was survived by two children.

Catfish Nation Celebration, a memorial concert, was held outside Cincinnati in Covington, Kentucky, at the Madison Theater and was attended by a number of musicians as well as hundreds of concertgoers.

== Discography ==
As sideman

- Super Bad - James Brown (1971)
- "What So Never The Dance", "My Mind Set Me Free"(single) - House Guests (1971)
- Stretchin' Out in - Bootsy's Rubber Band (1976)
- Ahh... The Name Is Bootsy, Baby! - Bootsy's Rubber Band (1977)
- A Blow for Me, a Toot to You - Fred Wesley and the Horny Horns (1977)
- All the Woo in the World - Bernie Worrell (1978)
- Bootsy? Player of the Year - Bootsy's Rubber Band (1978)
- This Boot Is Made for Fonk-N - Bootsy's Rubber Band (1979)
- Ultra Wave - Bootsy Collins (1980)
- The One Giveth, the Count Taketh Away - Bootsy Collins (1982)
- What's Bootsy Doin' - Bootsy Collins (1988)
