= Jabo Starks =

American drummer (1938–2018)

John "Jabo" Starks

Background information
- Born: John Henry Starks; October 26, 1937; Jackson, Alabama, U.S.
- Died: May 1, 2018 (aged 80) Mobile, Alabama, U.S.
- Genres: R&B; soul; blues; funk
- Occupation: Musician
- Instrument: Drums
- Years active: 1955–2018

John Henry "Jabo" Starks (/ˈdʒæboʊ/; October 26, 1937 (Note: Sources vary as to his year of birth. According to his obituary, published by Mobile Register, Starks was born on October 26, 1937; The New York Times gives 1938.) – May 1, 2018), sometimes spelled Jab'o, was an American funk and blues drummer best known for playing with James Brown as well as other notable musicians including Bobby Bland and B.B. King. A self-taught musician, he was known for his effective and clean drum patterns. He was one of the originators of funk drumming, and is one of the most sampled drummers.

== Life and career ==
Starks was born in Jackson, Alabama, to Prince Starks and Ruth Watkins. One of five children, he was nicknamed "Jabo" as a newborn. He grew up in Mobile, Alabama. In the seventh grade, he was captivated by drumbeats at a Mardi Gras parade in Mobile and decided to pursue drumming. He was self-taught and had no formal training. He said he "learned a lot from listening" to music. Early on, he listened to blues music and was influenced by the gospel music he heard in church. One of his drum idols was Shep Sheppard of the Bill Doggett band. He graduated from Mobile County Training School in 1955, at the time a high school. He then performed at the Harlem Duke Social Club where he backed notable blues and R&B musicians including John Lee Hooker, Smiley Lewis, Clarence "Gatemouth" Brown, Big Mama Thornton and Howlin' Wolf.

In 1959, Starks joined Bobby Bland's band and was the youngest member of the band. He said band members Pluma Davis and Joe Scott taught him the importance of holding the drum rhythm steady and having other musicians lock-in with drums. He said musically that was the best band he played with. He was with the band from 1959 to 1965 and recorded on the band's releases over this period, including "Turn on Your Love Light", "Stormy Monday Blues", "That's the Way Love Is", "I Pity the Fool" and "Don't Cry No More". He also recorded with other artists during this time such as Junior Parker and Joe Hinton, on songs "Driving Wheel" and "Funny".

In 1965, Starks joined James Brown's band. From 1965 to 1970, the band had two drummers, Starks and Clyde Stubblefield. Starks came primarily from a blues background whereas Stubblefield from a soul and jazz background. They each performed solo on songs that fit their style. The two "created the grooves on many of Brown's biggest hits, and laid the foundation for modern funk drumming in the process." In 1970, the band went through a major transformation with Stubblefield leaving the group in late 1970. Starks continued performing with the reconfigured band which became known as The J.B.'s. Band members included bassist Bootsy Collins and rhythm guitarist Catfish Collins who along with Starks formed the rhythm section. The band also included trombonist Fred Wesley. Starks toured and recorded with Brown until 1976. Starks' recordings during his eleven-year association with Brown include "The Payback", "Sex Machine", "Soul Power", "Super Bad", "Talkin' Loud and Sayin' Nothing", "Doing It to Death", "Papa Don't Take No Mess", "Licking Stick – Licking Stick". He also backed artists produced or managed by Brown, most notably Lyn Collins and Bobby Byrd, as well as the independent works released by The J.B.'s.

Often uncredited, Starks and Stubblefield rank as two of the most sampled drummers on contemporary hip hop and R&B recordings. Starks’ drum patterns have been sampled by LL Cool J, Kendrick Lamar, The Roots, A Tribe Called Quest, Black Eyed Peas, Kool Moe Dee, Rob Base and DJ E-Z Rock, Total and others. About the lack of recognition for his work, he said: "the least they could do is say where they got [the samples] from."

Starks left Brown's band in mid-1970s and joined blues artist B.B. King. Starks was well versed in blues music in his early career. In regard to his transition from uptempo funk to laid-back blues, he said "to me, everything stems from playing the blues anyway." He toured and recorded with King for six years. His recordings with King include the albums Lucille Talks Back and King Size.

Starks and Stubblefield remained friends. In 1999, they performed on The J.B.'s album Bring the Funk on Down. The duo went on to release original music as the Funkmasters. They released the album Find the Groove in 2001 and the album Come Get Summa This in 2006. They released an instructional video titled Soul of the Funky Drummers. In 2007, the duo joined Bootsy Collins for the first tribute concert in memory of James Brown and performed on the soundtrack for the movie Superbad.

In his later years Starks lived in Mobile, Alabama. From the mid-1990s onward, when not touring or recording, he performed five nights a week at the Picolo Restaurant and Red Bar in Grayton Beach, Florida, and on Sundays he played drums at his church in Mobile. He performed until March 2018. He said over the years he learned little tricks to help him maintain his drumming skills.

He died on May 1, 2018, at his home in Mobile, Alabama, at the age of 80 from leukemia and myelodysplastic syndrome. He was survived by his wife Naomi Taplin Starks, a daughter, a son, and two grandchildren.

== Recognition ==
In 2013, Starks and Stubblefield received the Yamaha Legacy Award. In 2016 Rolling Stone magazine named Starks and Stubblefield the sixth best drummer of all time. According to National Public Radio, "the grooves the two drummers (Starks and Stubblefield) created have inspired generations of artists – not just in funk, but in hip-hop, where their steady but intricate patterns make natural material for sampling."

Bassist Bootsy Collins called Starks the steady rock that he built his bass grooves on while with James Brown. Trombonist Fred Wesley called Starks his favorite drummer and said "I could just lose myself in that 'stop your heart' groove and just blow free.” According to The Pacemakers drummer Frank "Kash" Waddy, Starks was a disciplined player and his "forte was to play very clean, very straight ahead."

According to drummer-journalist Ahmir Thompson, Starks was Brown's "most effective drummer" and called his eight-on-the-floor style "unique". He credits Starks' drum patterns for the birth of New Jack Swing and Baltimore club/Jersey club styles. Drummer-author Jim Payne wrote: Starks "could put the groove somewhere between 16th notes and 16th-note triplets and turn funk into an infectious, swinging half-time shuffle. His drum tracks, sampled again and again by hip-hoppers and hit-makers, attest to the strength and longevity of his creative talents."

== Quotations ==
In a 1995 interview with WGBH, Starks said: "I'm not trying to outplay anybody else. The only thing I want to do is keep that heartbeat going as they call it, (...) the bass player or the guitar player or the horn player could do whatever he wants to do because he knows that that solid foundation is back there behind him."

In a 2015 interview with Mobile Bay Magazine, Starks said, "When I'm playing music (...) there ain't nobody in the world higher than I am."

== Selected discography ==
Credits adapted in part from AllMusic and Discogs.

With The Funkmasters as co-leader

- Find the Groove (Funkmasters, 2001)
- Come Get Summa This (Funkmasters, 2006)

With Bobby Bland

- Two Steps from the Blues (Duke, 1961)
- Here's the Man! (Duke, 1962)
- Call on Me/That's the Way Love Is (Duke, 1963)
- Ain't Nothing You Can Do (Duke, 1964)

With Bobby Byrd

- Live at the Garden (King, 1967)
- Live at the Apollo, Volume II (King, 1968)

With Lyn Collins

- Think (About It) (People, 1972)

With B.B. King

- Lucille Talks Back (ABC, 1975)
- King Size (ABC, 1977)

With The J.B.'s

- Food for Thought (People, 1972)
- Doing It to Death (People, 1973)
- Damn Right I Am Somebody (People, 1974)
- Bring the Funk on Down (P-Vine, 1999)
- Superbad – soundtrack (Lakeshore, 2007)

With Fred Wesley

- Funk for Your Ass (Columbia, 2008)

With Johnny J. Blair

- Fire (CJAM Productions, 2000)

== Instructional videos ==
- Soul of the Funky Drummers (1999)
