= The J.B.'s =

James Brown's backing band

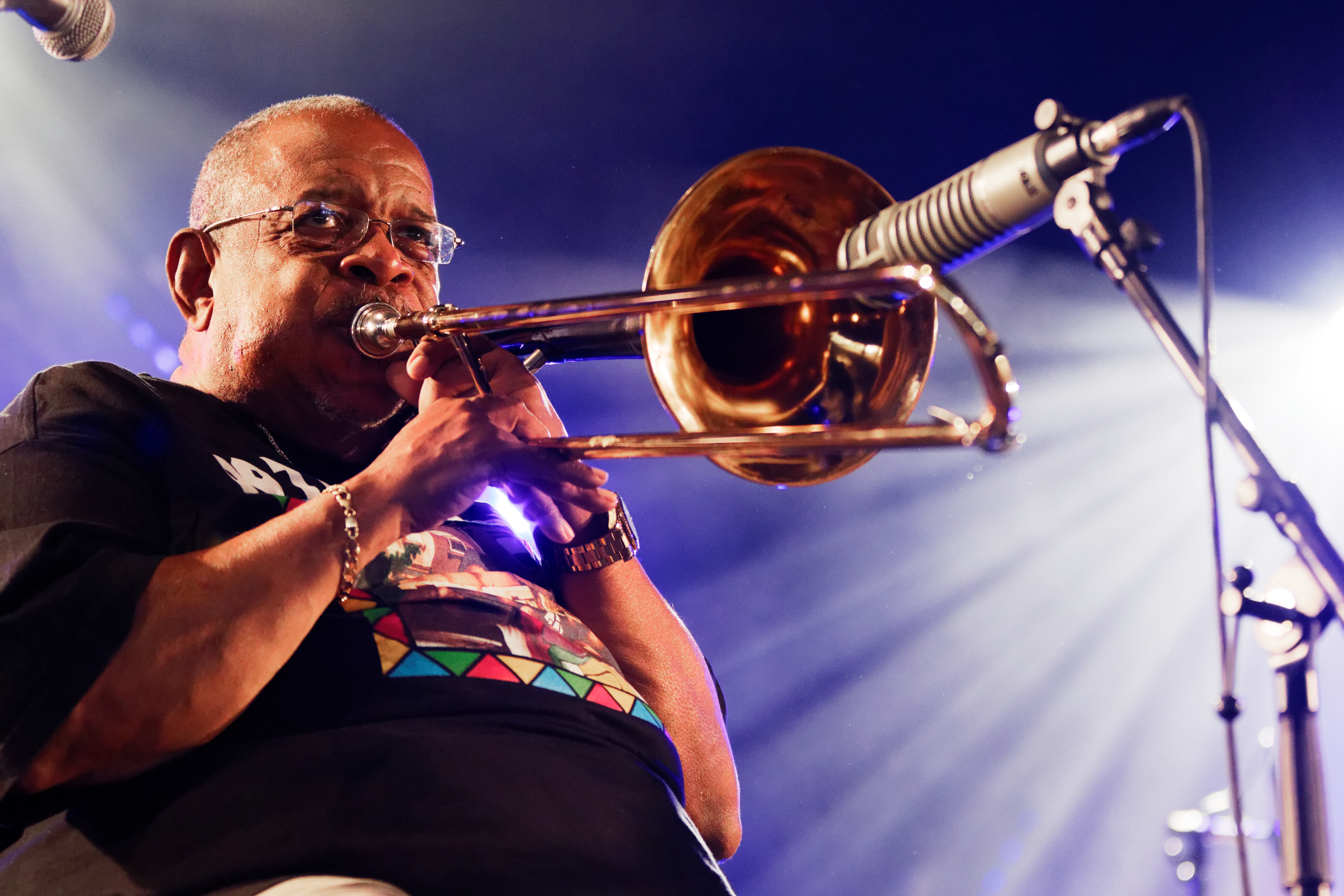
- Fred Wesley & the new JB's in 2016

Background information
- Also known as: The New Dapps, Fred Wesley and the J.B.'s, Fred and the New J.B.'s, The James Brown Soul Train, Maceo and the Macks, A.A.B.B., The First Family, The Last Word
- Origin: Cincinnati, Ohio, United States
- Genres: Funk, soul, R&B
- Years active: 1970–2006
- Labels: King, Polydor, People

The J.B.'s (sometimes punctuated The JB's or The J.B.s) was James Brown's band from 1970 through the early 1980s. On records, the band was sometimes billed under alternate names such as Fred Wesley and the JBs, The James Brown Soul Train, Maceo and the Macks, A.A.B.B., Fred Wesley and the New JBs, The First Family, and The Last Word. In addition to backing Brown, the J.B.'s played behind Bobby Byrd, Lyn Collins, and other singers associated with the James Brown Revue, and performed and recorded as a self-contained group. In 2015, they were nominated for induction into the Rock and Roll Hall of Fame but failed to be inducted and can be considered for Musical Excellence in the future. They have been eligible since 1995.

== Career ==
=== The "original" J.B.'s ===
The J.B.'s were formed in March 1970 after most of the members of Brown's previous band walked out on him over a pay dispute. (Brown's previous bands of the 1950s and 1960s had been known as The James Brown Band and The James Brown Orchestra.) The J.B.'s initial lineup included bassist William "Bootsy" Collins and his brother, guitarist Phelps "Catfish" Collins, formerly of the obscure funk band The Pacemakers; Bobby Byrd (founder of the original Famous Flames singing group) (organ), and John "Jabo" Starks (drums), both holdovers from Brown's 1960s band; three inexperienced horn players, Clayton "Chicken" Gunnells, Darryl "Hasaan" Jamison, and Robert McCollough; and conga player Johnny Griggs. This version of the J.B.'s played on some of Brown's most intense funk recordings, including "Get Up (I Feel Like Being a) Sex Machine", "Super Bad", "Soul Power", and "Talkin' Loud and Sayin' Nothing". They also accompanied Brown on a European tour (during which they recorded the long-delayed live album Love Power Peace), performed on the Sex Machine double LP, and released two instrumental singles, the much-sampled "The Grunt" and "These Are the J.B.'s".

=== Later configurations ===
In December 1970, trombonist Fred Wesley rejoined James Brown's organization to lead the J.B.'s. Other former Brown sidemen, including Maceo Parker and St. Clair Pinckney, eventually followed his lead, while the Collins brothers and most of the rest of the "original" J.B.'s left Brown to join George Clinton's Parliament-Funkadelic collective. Wesley and Parker left in 1975. Brown continued to bill his backing band as the J.B.'s into the mid-1980s, when he changed their name to the Soul Generals, or Soul G's.

=== Recordings ===
In addition to backing Brown on stage and on record during this era, the J.B.'s also recorded albums and singles on their own, sometimes with Brown performing on organ or synthesizer. Their albums were generally a mixture of heavy funk tracks and some more jazz-oriented pieces. Nearly all of the J.B.'s recordings were produced by Brown, and most were released on his own label, People Records. The band scored a number of chart hits in the early 1970s, including "Pass the Peas", "Gimme Some More", and the #1 R&B hit, "Doing It to Death". Credited to "Fred Wesley & the J.B.'s", "Doing It to Death" sold over one million copies and was awarded a gold disc by the RIAA in July 1973.

Some of the J.B.'s releases have unusual characteristics. The 1974 album Breakin' Bread is unique in that most of the songs have a Fred Wesley spoken reminiscence dubbed onto the beginning of the song, each time over a canned backing track. It is in sharp contrast to James Brown's real-time dominance of the proceedings on the classic Doing It to Death LP. A similar oddity is encountered on the other 1974 album, Damn Right I Am Somebody, where that album have been spliced onto the beginnings of most of the other songs. Under the name A.A.B.B., the group released a single, "Pick up the Pieces One by One", which reached #108 on the U.S. chart in 1975. Both the song and the name—which stood for "Above Average Black Band"—were a tribute to and tongue-in-cheek reply to the then-popular Scottish funk group the Average White Band (also known as AWB) and its #1 hit single "Pick Up the Pieces". The J.B.'s final single for Brown's People label, 1976's "Everybody Wanna Get Funky One More Time", features a rare hornless arrangement.

As funk music gave way in popularity to disco in the 1970s, the group's material and arrangements changed accordingly, but their chart success declined along with Brown's own.

Like most of James Brown's music, the recorded output of the J.B.'s has been heavily mined for samples by hip hop DJs and record producers.

=== The JB Horns ===
During the 1980s and 1990s, Maceo Parker and Fred Wesley intermittently toured under the name The JB Horns, sometimes with other former Brown sidemen such as Alfred "Pee Wee" Ellis. The JB Horns recorded several albums for the Gramavision label, which were later reissued by Rhino Records. They also recorded an album under this name with producer Richard Mazda called I Like It Like That.

The JB Horns are also associated with The Horny Horns, staple members of P-Funk and Bootsy's Rubber Band, which was led by Fred Wesley and included Maceo, as well as Rick Gardner and Richard "Kush" Griffith on trumpets.

=== Reunion ===
A version of the J.B.'s including Fred Wesley, Bootsy Collins, Pee Wee Ellis, Bobby Byrd, and Clyde Stubblefield assembled to record the 1999 "reunion" album Bring the Funk on Down, dedicated to the memory of St. Clair Pinckney. The album was released in Japan by P-Vine Records, and in 2002 it was reissued in the U.S. by Instinct Records.

A reunion of the original J.B.'s rhythm section, with Bootsy and Phelps Collins, Clyde Stubblefield, and Jabo Starks, and supplemented by Bernie Worrell, recorded the Superbad movie soundtrack. They went on to perform the first tribute concert remembering James Brown.

== Discography ==
=== Albums ===
- Food for Thought (1972)
- Doing It to Death (1973)
- Damn Right I Am Somebody (1974) – as "Fred Wesley & the J.B.'s"
- Breakin' Bread (1974) – as "Fred & the New J.B.'s"
- Hustle with Speed (1975)
- Jam II Disco Fever (1978)
- Groove Machine (1979)
- Bring the Funk On Down (1999)

=== Singles ===
- 1970
  - "The Grunt, Pt 1" / "Pt 2"
  - "These Are the J.B.'s, Pt 1" / "Pt 2"
- 1971
  - "My Brother, Pt 1" / "Pt 2"
  - "Gimme Some More" / "The Rabbit Got The Gun"
- 1972
  - "Pass the Peas" / "Hot Pants Road"
  - "Givin' Up Food For Funk, Pt 1" / "Pt 2"
  - "Back Stabbers" / "J.B. Shout"
- 1973
  - "Watermelon Man" / "Alone Again (Naturally)"
  - "Sportin' Life" / "Dirty Harri"
  - "Doing It to Death" / "Everybody Got Soul"
  - "You Can Have Watergate" / "If You Don't Get It The First Time..."
  - "Same Beat, Pt 1" / "Pt 2"
- 1974
  - "Damn Right I Am Somebody, Pt 1" / "Pt 2"
  - "Rockin' Funky Watergate, Pt 1" / "Pt 2"
  - "Little Boy Black" / "Rockin' Funky Watergate"
  - "Breakin' Bread" / "Funky Music is My Style"
- 1975
  - "Makin' Love" / "Rice 'n' Ribs"
  - "(It's Not the Express) It's the J.B.'s Monaurail, Pt 1" / "Pt 2"
  - "Thank You for Lettin' Me Be Myself and You Be Yours Pt 1" / "Pt 2"
  - "Pick up the Pieces One by One" / "C.O.L.D." (A.A.B.B.)
- 1976
  - "All Aboard The Soul Funky Train" / "Thank You for Lettin'... Pt 1"
  - "Everybody Wanna Get Funky One More Time, Pt 1" / "Pt 2"
- 1977
  - "Music For The People" / "Crossover" – as the J.B.'s International
  - "Nature, Pt 1" / "Pt 2" – as the J.B.'s International
- 1978
  - "Disco Fever, Pt 1" / "Pt 2" – as the J.B.'s International

=== CD compilations ===
- Funky Good Time: The Anthology (2 CD) (1995)
- Food for Funk (1997)
- Pass the Peas: The Best of the J.B.'s (2000)

== Members through the years as (THE JB's, THE JB's international and The Soul Generals) ==
- Fred Wesley (1968–1975, 1983)
- Maceo Parker (1964–1969, 1973–1975, 1984–1988)
- Jimmy Nolen (1965–1969, 1972–1983)
- Fred Thomas (1971–1975, 1980–1983, 1993–2006)
- John "Jabo" Starks (1966–1975)
- Clyde Stubblefield (1966–1970)
- Bootsy Collins (1970–1971)
- Phelps Collins (1970–1971)
- St. Clair Pinckney (1962–1999)
- Johnny Griggs (1971–1979, 1984–1988)
- Sweet Charles Sherrell (1969–1979, 1983–1997)
- Pee Wee Ellis (1965–1969)
- Bernard Odum (1959–1968, 1994-1997)
- Hearlon "Cheese" Martin (1970–1975)
- Darryl "Hassan" Jamison (1970–1971, 1972–1975)
- Jerone "Jassan" Sanford (1971–1975, 1978–1983)
- Clayton "Chicken" Gunnells (1970–1971)
- Robert "Chopper" McCollough (1970)
- Jimmy Parker (1971–1975)
- Ike Oakley (1972–1974)
- Russel Crimes (1971–1978)
- Robert Lee Coleman (1971, 1976)
- Bobby Roach (1970–1972)
- John Morgan (1971–1975)
- Hollie Farris (1976–1994, 2001–2006)
- Joe Poff (1976–1981, 1986, 1991)
- Melvin Parker (1964–1969, 1976–1977)
- Tyrone Jefferson (1976–1980, 1984, 1991–2006)
- Tony Cook (1976–1993, 2005–2006)
- David Weston (1976–1982)
- Keith Jenkins (1994–2006)
- Jeff Watkins (1994–2006)
- Arthur Dickson (1978–1998)
- Ron Laster (1978–2006)
- Robert "Mousey" Thompson (1993–2006)
- Aaron Purdie (197?–198?)
- Erik Hargrove (1998–2005)
- Jerry Pondixter (1978–1983, 1992–2005)
- George "Spike" Nealy (1991–2006)
- Ray Brundidge (1998–2006)
- Damon Wood (1999–2006)
- Robert "The Plaster" (2006)
- Jimmy Lee Moore (1984–2001)
- Joe Collier (1981–2000)
- Larry Moore (1984–1992)
- Todd Owens (1992–2001)
- Leroy Harper Jr. (1991–1993, 1997–2006)
- Sir Waldow Weathers (1993–2006)
- George "Haji Ahkba" Dickerson (1984–1988)
- Tony Jones (1984–1988, 1994, 1997–2001)
- J? Jackson (1991–1994)
- Darryl Brown (1999–2006)

== See also ==
- Booker T. & the M.G.'s
- Compass Point All Stars
- The Funk Brothers
- Hi Rhythm Section
- The Love Unlimited Orchestra
- The Memphis Boys
- MFSB
- Muscle Shoals Rhythm Section
- Salsoul Orchestra
- Tower of Power Horn Section
