= Record labels owned by James Brown =

Over the course of his career James Brown owned and operated several different record labels, which he used primarily to release his own productions of artists associated with his revue.

== Try Me ==
Try Me logo (partly cut off)

Brown founded his first label, Try Me Records, in 1963 under the auspices of Syd Nathan's King Records. Named after Brown's 1958 R&B hit, Try Me released a handful of singles by performers and groups associated with the James Brown Revue, including Brown's backing band (recording under the name the Poets), Johnny and Bill (Johnny Terry and Bill Hollings, both members of the Famous Flames), and female vocalist Tammy Montgomery, who went on to record for Motown as Tammi Terrell. It ceased operations in the wake of Brown's 1964 contract dispute with King.

== Brownstone ==
Brownstone logo

Brownstone Records, founded in 1970, was a joint venture between Brown and his longtime associate in the music business Henry Stone (an alliance reflected in the label's name). It was established as an outlet for recordings by members of Brown's revue who King had declined to record, such as former Famous Flames member Bobby Byrd and his wife Vicki Anderson. The label released eleven singles in 1970 and 1971 before it was superseded by People Records.

Brownstone was reactivated in 1976 and distributed under Henry Stone's TK Productions umbrella of record labels until 1977, again briefly in 1992 under Stone's company Hot Productions, and then once more under his current company, Henry Stone Music.

== People ==
People logo

People Records, Brown's most successful and prolific label, was founded in 1971. Like its predecessors, People was used to release recordings by performers associated with the James Brown Revue, including Lyn Collins, Bobby Byrd, Sweet Charles and the J.B.'s. It also recorded some musicians who did not regularly perform with Brown. Brown himself appeared in a supporting role on many People releases, playing organ or contributing backing vocals.

Initially distributed by King, People was acquired by Polydor on July 1, 1971, when Brown signed with that label. Unlike Brown's previous labels, it was commercially successful for a while; it released a number of charting singles, including the #1 R&B hit "Doing It to Death". People eventually folded in 1976, concomitant with the dissolution of the J.B.'s. The label's output was later anthologized in a series of three CDs released by Polydor titled James Brown's Funky People.

- A year prior to the founding of Brown's People label, there was another People Records that was founded and run by former Motown Records producer William "Mickey" Stevenson, but it was not related.

== See also ==
- List of record labels
