= St. Clair Pinckney =

American saxophonist

St. Clair Pinckney (September 17, 1930 – February 1, 1999) was an American saxophonist who performed with James Brown as a member of the James Brown Orchestra and The J.B.'s. He played tenor and baritone saxophone.

Suffering from health issues for years, Pinckney left Brown's band shortly before his death in 1999.

== Discography ==
=== Albums ===
- Private Stock - Ichiban Records – ICH 1036 (1989)
- Do You Like It - Ichiban Records – ICH 1014 (1987)

=== Singles ===
- " Summer Breeze" / " Summer Breeze" Ichiban Records 129 (1988)
- "As We Lay" / "Last Train To Lakewood" - Ichiban Records 87 - 129
- "Do You Like It" / "As We Lay", "Shake You Down U" - Ichiban Records ICHT 701 (12")

=== As Sideman ===
- With James Brown
- Grits & Soul(1964)
- It's A Mother(1969)
- Say It Loud – I'm Black and I'm Proud (1969)
- Sex Machine(1970)
- Love Power Peace(1971)
- Hot Pants (album)(1971)
