= Billboard Top R&B Records of 1950 =

American music chart

Billboard Top R&B Records of 1950 is made up of two year-end charts compiled by Billboard magazine ranking the year's top rhythm and blues records based on record sales and juke box plays.

Retail year-end	Juke box year-end	Title	Artist(s)	Label
1	2	"Pink Champagne"	Joe Liggins and His "Honeydrippers"	Specialty
2	4	"Double Crossing Blues"	Johnny Otis Quintette (vocals by The Robins and Little Esther)	Savoy
3	10	"I Need You So"	Ivory Joe Hunter	M-G-M
4	20	"Hard Luck Blues"	Roy Brown	Deluxe
5	8	"Cupid's Boogie"	Little Esther (with Mel Walker and Johnny Otis Orchestra)	Savoy
6	1	"I Almost Lost My Mind"	Ivory Joe Hunter	M-G-M
7	11	"Well Oh Well"	Tiny Bradshaw	King
8	9	"Blue Light Boogie"	Louis Jordan	Decca
9	3	"For You My Love"	Larry Darnell	Regal
10	15	"Mistrustin' Blues"	Little Esther, Mel Walker (accompanied by The Johnny Otis Orchestra)	Savoy
11	5	"Every Day I Have the Blues"	Lowell Fulson	Swingtime
12	6	"Blue Shadows"	Lowell Fulson	Swingtime
13	13	"Anytime, Any Place, Anywhere"	Joe Morris	Atlantic
14	14	"Why Do Things Happen to Me?"	Roy Hawkins	Modern
15	7	"Mona Lisa"	Nat King Cole	Capitol
16	NR	"I Wanna Be Loved"	Dinah Washington	Mercury
17	12	"Please Send Me Someone to Love"	Percy Mayfield	Specialty
18	NR	"I Love My Baby"	Larry Darnell	Regal
19	23	"Saturday Night Fish Fry"	Louis Jordan	Decca
20	NR	"Cry, Cry, Baby"	Ed Wiley	Sittin' In
21	24	"Teardrops from My Eyes"	Ruth Brown	Atlantic
22	25	"Love Don't Love Nobody"	Roy Brown	DeLuxe
23	16	"The Fat Man"	Fats Domino	Imperial
24	NR	"My Baby's Gone"	Charles Brown	Aladdin
25	18	"Information Blues"	Roy Milton	Specialty
26	NR	"I'm Yours to Keep"	Herb Fisher	Modern
27	29	"It Isn't Fair"	Dinah Washington	Mercury
28	22	"I'll Get Along Somehow"	Larry Darnell	Regal
29	NR	"Bad, Bad Whiskey"	Amos Milburn	Aladdin
30	NR	"Deceivin' Blues"	Little Esther and Mel Walker (with Johnny Otis Orchestra)	Savoy
NR	17	"Rag Mop"	Lionel Hampton	Decca
NR	19	"I'll Never Be Free"	Paul Gayten, Annie Laurie	Regal
NR	21	"Three Times Seven"	Jewel King	Imperial
NR	26	"I Quit My Pretty Mama"	Ivory Joe Hunter	King
NR	27	"Rag Mop"	Doc Sausage	Regal
NR	28	"School Days"	Louis Jordan	Decca
NR	29	"It Isn't Fair"	Dinah Washington	Mercury
NR	30	"Sittin' on It All the Time"	Wynonie Harris	King

== See also ==
- List of Billboard number-one R&B songs of 1950
- Billboard year-end top 30 singles of 1950
- 1950 in music
