= List of Billboard number-one R&B songs of 1950 =

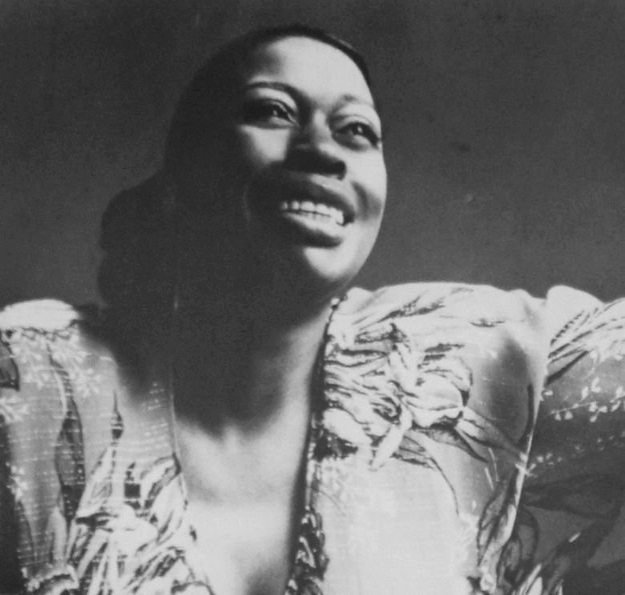
Esther Phillips, then billed as Little Esther, was the featured vocalist on three number ones for the band led by Johnny Otis.

In 1950, Billboard magazine published two charts covering the top-performing songs in the United States in rhythm and blues (R&B) and related African-American-oriented music genres: Best Selling Retail Rhythm & Blues Records and Most Played Juke Box Rhythm & Blues Records, based on sales in stores and plays in jukeboxes respectively. The two charts are considered part of the lineage of the magazine's multimetric R&B chart launched in 1958, which since 2005 has been published under the title Hot R&B/Hip-Hop Songs.

In the issue of Billboard dated January 7, 1950, Louis Jordan and his Tympany Five topped both charts with "Saturday Night Fish Fry" (Parts I & II), which had experienced lengthy runs atop both listings in the last quarter of 1949 and added a single week to each tally in the new year before being displaced from the top spot of both charts by Larry Darnell's "For You My Love". Jordan returned to number one later in the year with "Blue Light Boogie", his 18th and final number one. Having first reached number one in 1943, Jordan was by far the most successful artist of the 1940s on Billboard's R&B charts. His tally of chart-toppers was a record which stood until the 1980s, and "Blue Light Boogie" took his total number of weeks at number one to 113,^{[a]} more than three times the figure achieved by any other act to this point and a record which stood in the 21st century. Jordan's success fell away in the 1950s, but his music is considered to have been hugely influential on the development of both R&B and rock and roll.

In addition to Jordan, Johnny Otis and Ivory Joe Hunter each achieved multiple number ones in 1950. Otis and his band topped the best sellers chart twice and the juke box listing three times; "Cupid's Boogie" missed the top spot on the former, peaking at number two. Vocalist Little Esther, aged 14, received featured credit on all three of Otis's chart-toppers and Mel Walker on two. Otis and his band spent 13 weeks atop the best sellers chart, the most achieved by any act. On the juke box listing, Joe Liggins and his Honeydrippers had the highest total number of weeks at number one, also with 13 weeks. Liggins's song "Pink Champagne" was the year's longest-running chart-topper on both listings, spending 13 non-consecutive weeks atop the juke box chart and 11 consecutive weeks in the peak position on the best sellers chart. It was the second of two long-running number one for Liggins following 1945's "The Honeydripper", which spent a record-setting 18 weeks in the peak position, but by the end of 1951 his chart career was over. Artists who reached number one for the first time in 1950 included Joe Morris and Percy Mayfield, both of whom reached the top spot with their first charting singles. Another first-time chart-topper was Ruth Brown, whose single "Teardrops from My Eyes" was the final number one of 1950 on both charts. Nat "King" Cole gained his first number one for six years when his Trio topped the juke box chart with "Mona Lisa", which achieved sufficient crossover success to also top Billboard's pop charts, the only one of 1950's R&B number ones to achieve this feat.

== Chart history ==
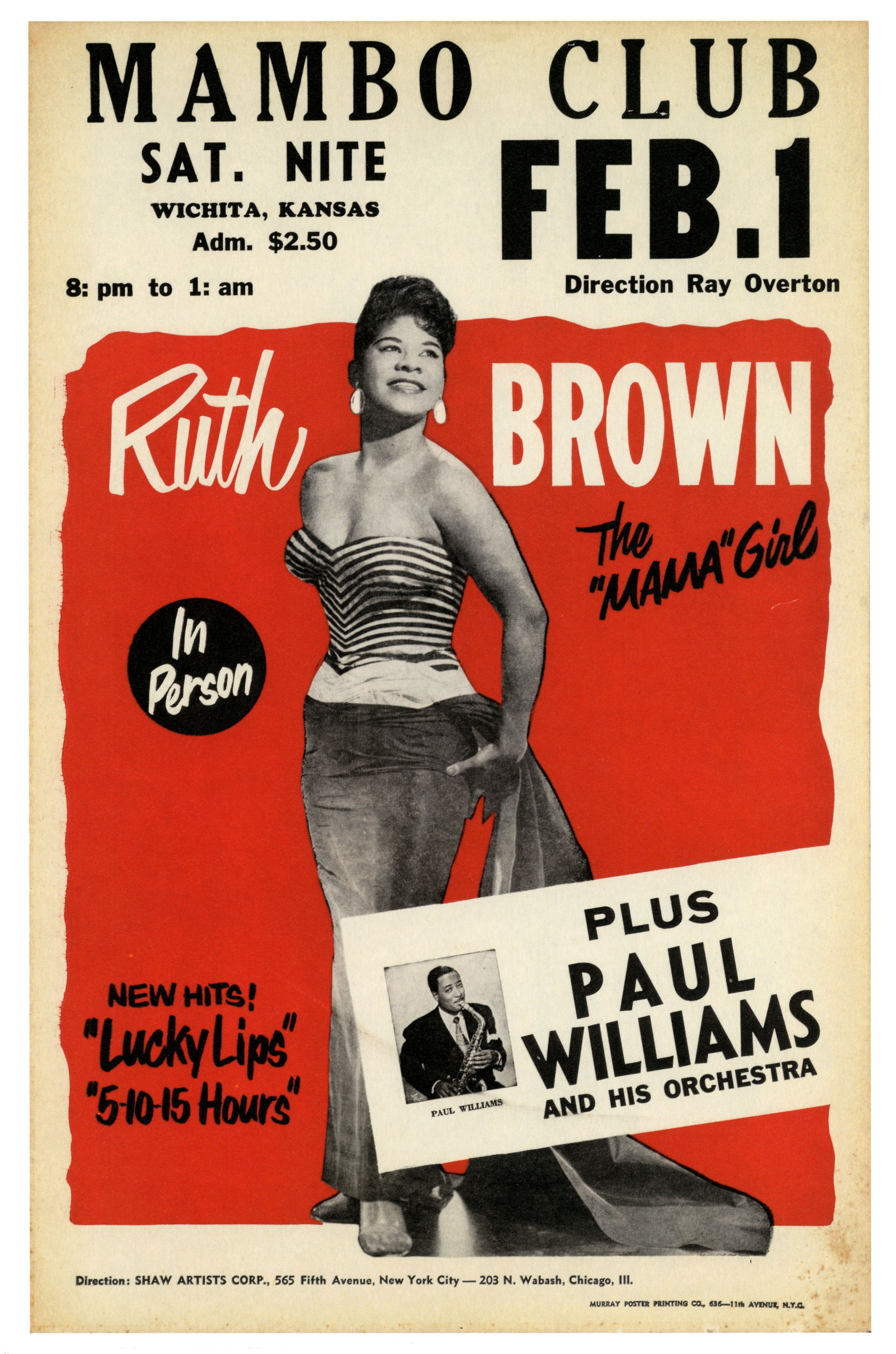
"Teardrops from My Eyes" was a number one for Ruth Brown.

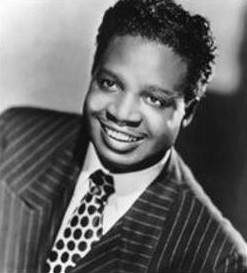
Roy Brown topped the best sellers chart with "Hard Luck Blues".

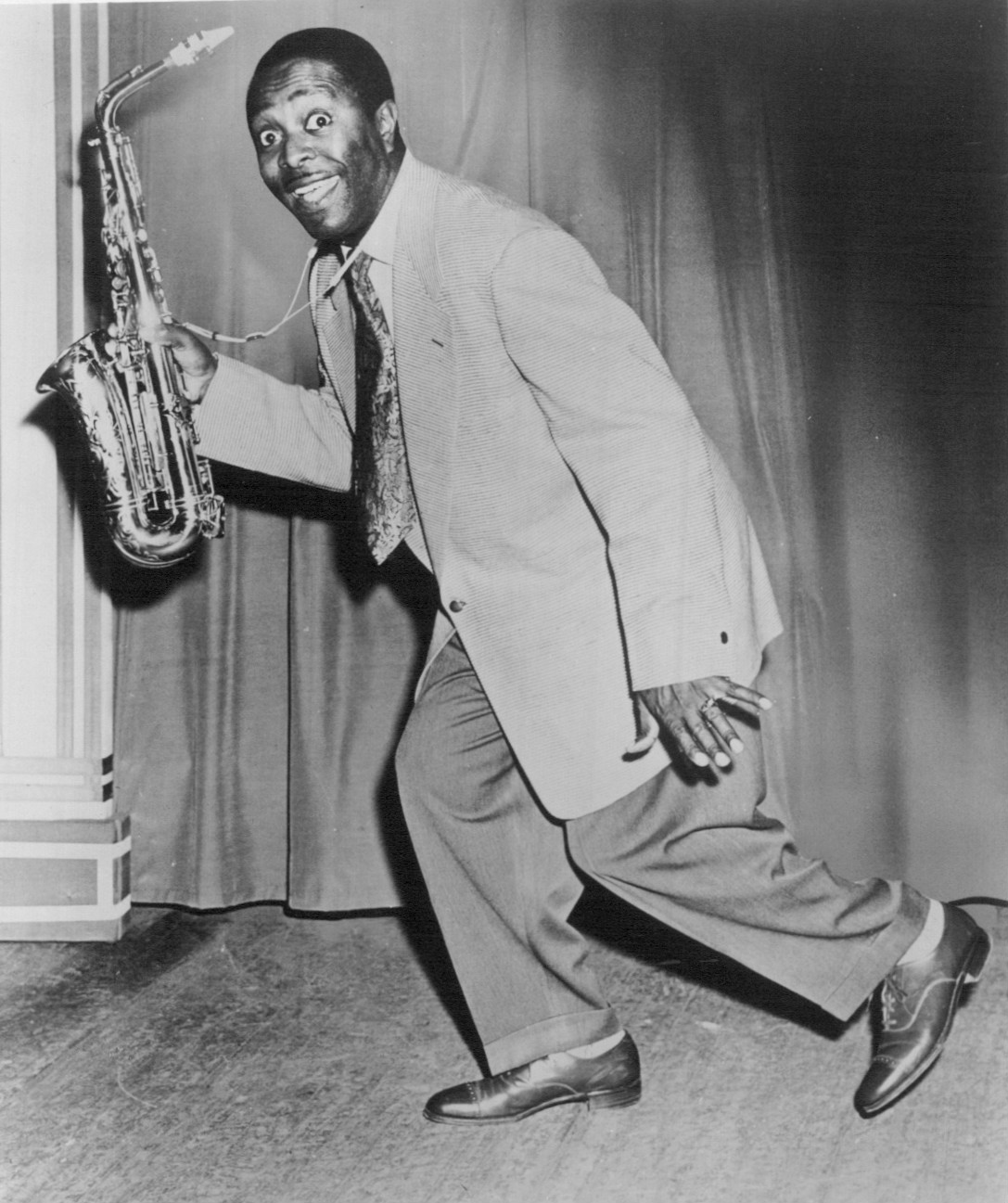
Louis Jordan achieved his final number one in 1950 with "Blue Light Boogie". His total number of weeks in the top spot vastly exceeded that achieved by any other artist to this point.

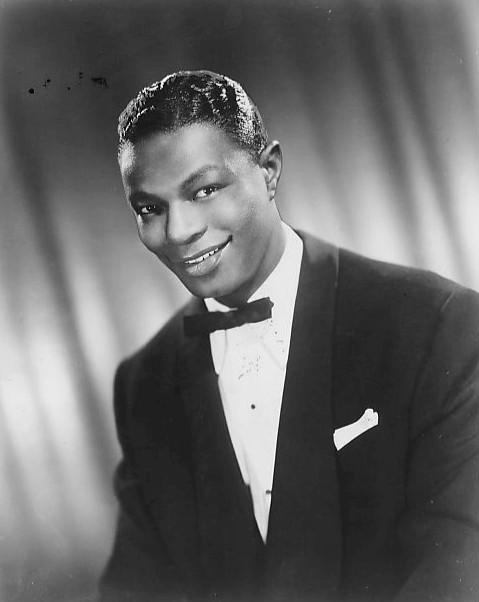
Nat "King" Cole had his first number one since 1944 with "Mona Lisa".

Chart history
Issue date	Juke Box		Best Sellers		Ref.
Issue date	Title	Artist(s)	Title	Artist(s)	Ref.
January 7	"Saturday Night Fish Fry" (Parts I & II)	Louis Jordan and his Tympany Five	"Saturday Night Fish Fry" (Parts I & II)	Louis Jordan and his Tympany Five	
January 14	"For You My Love"	Larry Darnell	"For You My Love"	Larry Darnell	
January 21	"For You My Love"	Larry Darnell	"For You My Love"	Larry Darnell	
January 28	"For You My Love"	Larry Darnell	"For You My Love"	Larry Darnell	
February 4	"For You My Love"	Larry Darnell	"For You My Love"	Larry Darnell	
February 11	"For You My Love"	Larry Darnell	"For You My Love"	Larry Darnell	
February 18	"For You My Love"	Larry Darnell	"I Almost Lost My Mind"	Ivory Joe Hunter	
February 25	"I Almost Lost My Mind"	Ivory Joe Hunter	"I Almost Lost My Mind"	Ivory Joe Hunter	
March 4	"I Almost Lost My Mind"	Ivory Joe Hunter	"Double Crossing Blues"	Johnny Otis Quintette, The Robins, and Little Esther	
March 11	"I Almost Lost My Mind"	Ivory Joe Hunter	"Double Crossing Blues"	Johnny Otis Quintette, The Robins, and Little Esther	
March 18	"I Almost Lost My Mind"	Ivory Joe Hunter	"Double Crossing Blues"	Johnny Otis Quintette, The Robins, and Little Esther	
March 25	"Double Crossing Blues"	Johnny Otis Quintette, The Robins, and Little Esther	"Double Crossing Blues"	Johnny Otis Quintette, The Robins, and Little Esther	
April 1	"Double Crossing Blues"	Johnny Otis Quintette, The Robins, and Little Esther	"Double Crossing Blues"	Johnny Otis Quintette, The Robins, and Little Esther	
April 8	"Double Crossing Blues"	Johnny Otis Quintette, The Robins, and Little Esther	"Double Crossing Blues"	Johnny Otis Quintette, The Robins, and Little Esther	
April 15	"Mistrustin' Blues"	Little Esther with Mel Walker and the Johnny Otis Orchestra	"Double Crossing Blues"	Johnny Otis Quintette, The Robins, and Little Esther	
April 22	"Mistrustin' Blues"	Little Esther with Mel Walker and the Johnny Otis Orchestra	"Double Crossing Blues"	Johnny Otis Quintette, The Robins, and Little Esther	
April 29	"I Almost Lost My Mind"	Ivory Joe Hunter	"Double Crossing Blues"	Johnny Otis Quintette, The Robins, and Little Esther	
May 6	"Mistrustin' Blues"	Little Esther with Mel Walker and the Johnny Otis Orchestra	"Mistrustin' Blues"	Little Esther with Mel Walker and the Johnny Otis Orchestra	
May 13	"I Need You So"	Ivory Joe Hunter	"Mistrustin' Blues"	Little Esther with Mel Walker and the Johnny Otis Orchestra	
May 20	"I Need You So"	Ivory Joe Hunter	"Mistrustin' Blues"	Little Esther with Mel Walker and the Johnny Otis Orchestra	
May 27	"Pink Champagne"	Joe Liggins and his Honeydrippers	"Mistrustin' Blues"	Little Esther with Mel Walker and the Johnny Otis Orchestra	
June 3	"Pink Champagne"	Joe Liggins and his Honeydrippers	"Pink Champagne"	Joe Liggins and his Honeydrippers	
June 10	"Pink Champagne"	Joe Liggins and his Honeydrippers	"Pink Champagne"	Joe Liggins and his Honeydrippers	
June 17	"Pink Champagne"	Joe Liggins and his Honeydrippers	"Pink Champagne"	Joe Liggins and his Honeydrippers	
June 24	"Pink Champagne"	Joe Liggins and his Honeydrippers	"Pink Champagne"	Joe Liggins and his Honeydrippers	
July 1	"Pink Champagne"	Joe Liggins and his Honeydrippers	"Pink Champagne"	Joe Liggins and his Honeydrippers	
July 8	"Cupid's Boogie"	Johnny Otis Orchestra, Little Esther, and Mel Walker	"Pink Champagne"	Joe Liggins and his Honeydrippers	
July 15	"Pink Champagne"	Joe Liggins and his Honeydrippers	"Pink Champagne"	Joe Liggins and his Honeydrippers	
July 22	"Pink Champagne"	Joe Liggins and his Honeydrippers	"Pink Champagne"	Joe Liggins and his Honeydrippers	
July 29	"Pink Champagne"	Joe Liggins and his Honeydrippers	"Pink Champagne"	Joe Liggins and his Honeydrippers	
August 5	"Pink Champagne"	Joe Liggins and his Honeydrippers	"Pink Champagne"	Joe Liggins and his Honeydrippers	
August 12	"Pink Champagne"	Joe Liggins and his Honeydrippers	"Pink Champagne"	Joe Liggins and his Honeydrippers	
August 19	"Pink Champagne"	Joe Liggins and his Honeydrippers	"Hard Luck Blues"	Roy Brown	
August 26	"Pink Champagne"	Joe Liggins and his Honeydrippers	"Hard Luck Blues"	Roy Brown	
September 2	"Mona Lisa"	"King" Cole Trio	"Hard Luck Blues"	Roy Brown	
September 9	"Mona Lisa"	"King" Cole Trio	"Blue Light Boogie" (Parts 1 & 2)	Louis Jordan and his Tympany Five	
September 16	"Mona Lisa"	"King" Cole Trio	"Blue Light Boogie" (Parts 1 & 2)	Louis Jordan and his Tympany Five	
September 23	"Mona Lisa"	"King" Cole Trio	"Blue Light Boogie" (Parts 1 & 2)	Louis Jordan and his Tympany Five	
September 30	"Blue Light Boogie" (Parts 1 & 2)	Louis Jordan and his Tympany Five	"Blue Light Boogie" (Parts 1 & 2)	Louis Jordan and his Tympany Five	
October 7	"Blue Light Boogie" (Parts 1 & 2)	Louis Jordan and his Tympany Five	"Blue Light Boogie" (Parts 1 & 2)	Louis Jordan and his Tympany Five	
October 14	"Blue Light Boogie" (Parts 1 & 2)	Louis Jordan and his Tympany Five	"Blue Light Boogie" (Parts 1 & 2)	Louis Jordan and his Tympany Five	
October 21	"Blue Light Boogie" (Parts 1 & 2)	Louis Jordan and his Tympany Five	"Blue Light Boogie" (Parts 1 & 2)	Louis Jordan and his Tympany Five	
October 28	"Blue Shadows"	Lowell Fulson	"Blue Shadows"	Lowell Fulson	
November 4	"Blue Shadows"	Lowell Fulson	"Anytime — Any Place — Anywhere"	Joe Morris and his Orchestra	
November 11	"Blue Shadows"	Lowell Fulson	"Anytime — Any Place — Anywhere"	Joe Morris and his Orchestra	
November 18	"Blue Shadows"	Lowell Fulson	"Anytime — Any Place — Anywhere"	Joe Morris and his Orchestra	
November 25	"Anytime — Any Place — Anywhere"	Joe Morris and his Orchestra	"Please Send Me Someone to Love"	Percy Mayfield and his Orchestra	
December 2	"Anytime — Any Place — Anywhere"	Joe Morris and his Orchestra	"Anytime — Any Place — Anywhere"	Joe Morris and his Orchestra	
December 9	"Anytime — Any Place — Anywhere"	Joe Morris and his Orchestra	"Teardrops from My Eyes"	Ruth Brown	
December 16	"Please Send Me Someone to Love"	Percy Mayfield and his Orchestra	"Please Send Me Someone to Love"	Percy Mayfield and his Orchestra	
December 23	"Teardrops from My Eyes"	Ruth Brown	"Teardrops from My Eyes"	Ruth Brown	
December 30	"Teardrops from My Eyes"	Ruth Brown	"Teardrops from My Eyes"	Ruth Brown	

== Notes ==
a. Jordan's first 16 number ones occurred at a time when Billboard published only one R&B chart. His final two number ones occurred during a period when the magazine published two charts and each topped both listings, but the figure of 113 weeks at number one does not double-count weeks when he topped both.
