= List of artists who reached number one on the Billboard R&B chart =

This is a list of all the musicians and music groups who reached number one on the Billboard R&B singles chart.

The chart was officially titled as follows:

Oct 1942 – Feb 1945 The Harlem Hit Parade
Feb 1945 – Jun 1949 Race Records
Jun 1949 – Oct 1958 Rhythm & Blues Records
Oct 1958 – Nov 1963 Hot R&B Sides
Nov 1963 – Jan 1965 No chart published
Jan 1965 – Aug 1969 Hot Rhythm & Blues Singles
Aug 1969 – Jul 1973 Best Selling Soul Singles
Jul 1973 – Jun 1982 Hot Soul Singles
Jun 1982 – Oct 1990 Hot Black Singles
Oct 1990 – Jan 1999 Hot R&B Singles
Jan 1999 – Dec 1999 Hot R&B Singles & Tracks
Dec 1999 – Apr 2005 Hot R&B/Hip-Hop Singles & Tracks
April 2005 – present Hot R&B/Hip-Hop Songs

Lists are alphabetical by year.
NOTE : Annual totals may not sum to 52 weeks because:

1. sometimes the No. 1 place was shared
2. totals are counted from the start of the stay at No. 1 - for example, a hit which reached No. 1 in November 1945 and stayed there 11 weeks is included in the 1945 list but not 1946.

As well as the R&B best sellers (BS) chart, between 1948 and 1957 there was also an R&B juke box (JB) chart, and from 1955 to 1958 there was an R&B airplay (JY - jockeys) chart. These charts were consolidated into one in October 1958. Years at No. 1 on these different charts are listed where appropriate.

== 1942 ==
- Bing Crosby (3 weeks)
- Earl Hines (1 week)
- Andy Kirk (1 week)
- Lucky Millinder (2 weeks)
- Freddie Slack (2 weeks)
- Paul Whiteman and Billie Holiday (3 weeks)

== 1943 ==
- Bea Booze (4 weeks)
- Nat "King" Cole (3 weeks)
- Bonnie Davis (5 weeks)
- Duke Ellington (5 weeks)
- Erskine Hawkins (14 weeks)
- Dick Haymes (4 weeks)
- The Ink Spots (9 weeks)
- Harry James (1 week)
- Louis Jordan (1 week)
- Lucky Millinder (3 weeks)
- Ella Mae Morse (2 weeks)

== 1944 ==
- Benny Carter (2 weeks)
- Nat "King" Cole (14 weeks)
- Duke Ellington (12 weeks)
- Benny Goodman (1 week)
- Lionel Hampton (6 weeks)
- The Ink Spots and Ella Fitzgerald (12 weeks)
- Buddy Johnson (1 week)
- Louis Jordan (7 weeks)
- Johnny Mercer (1 week)
- The Mills Brothers (1 week)

== 1945 ==
- Cecil Gant (2 weeks)
- Erskine Hawkins (6 weeks)
- Louis Jordan (8 weeks)
- Joe Liggins (18 weeks)
- Lucky Millinder (8 weeks)
- Roosevelt Sykes (7 weeks)
- Cootie Williams (1 week)

== 1946 ==
- Ella Fitzgerald (with Louis Jordan) (5 weeks)
- Lionel Hampton (16 weeks)
- The Ink Spots (3 weeks)
- Louis Jordan (35 weeks, inc. 5 weeks with Ella Fitzgerald)

== 1947 ==
- Savannah Churchill (8 weeks)
- Louis Jordan (40 weeks)
- Julia Lee (12 weeks)
- Eddie Vinson (2 weeks)

== 1948 ==
- Roy Brown (1 week JB)
- Pee Wee Crayton (1 week BS, 3 weeks JB)
- Wynonie Harris (1 week BS, 1 week JB)
- Ivory Joe Hunter (3 weeks BS, 3 weeks JB)
- Bull Moose Jackson (11 weeks BS, 7 weeks JB)
- Lonnie Johnson (7 weeks BS, 7 weeks JB)
- Louis Jordan (2 weeks JB)
- Julia Lee (9 weeks)
- Memphis Slim (2 weeks JB)
- Amos Milburn (7 weeks BS, 7 weeks JB)
- Red Miller (4 weeks BS, 5 weeks JB)
- The Orioles (1 week JB)
- Hal Singer (4 weeks BS, 4 weeks JB)
- Arbee Stidham (1 week BS, 1 week JB)
- Sonny Thompson (4 weeks BS, 3 weeks JB)
- Dinah Washington (1 week JB)

== 1949 ==
- Charles Brown (15 weeks BS, 11 weeks JB)
- Larry Darnell (6 weeks BS, 8 weeks JB)
- Wynonie Harris (1 week BS, 2 weeks JB)
- John Lee Hooker (1 week JB)
- Louis Jordan (12 weeks BS, 12 weeks JB)
- Big Jay McNeely (1 week BS, 1 week JB)
- Amos Milburn (2 weeks JB)
- The Orioles (1 week BS)
- Dinah Washington (2 weeks BS, 1 week JB)
- Paul Williams (12 weeks BS, 14 weeks JB)
- Jimmy Witherspoon (1 week BS)

== 1950 ==
- Roy Brown (3 weeks BS)
- Ruth Brown (11 weeks BS, 7 weeks JB)
- Nat "King" Cole (4 weeks JB)
- Lowell Fulson (1 week BS, 4 weeks JB)
- Ivory Joe Hunter (2 weeks BS, 7 weeks JB)
- Louis Jordan (7 weeks BS, 4 weeks JB)
- Joe Liggins (11 weeks BS, 13 weeks JB)
- Percy Mayfield (2 weeks BS, 1 week JB)
- Joe Morris (4 weeks BS, 3 weeks JB)
- Johnny Otis and Little Esther (13 weeks BS, 10 weeks JB) (9 weeks BS / 5 weeks JB with The Robins, 4 weeks BS / 5 weeks JB with Mel Walker)

== 1951 ==
- Earl Bostic (4 weeks BS)
- Jackie Brenston (3 weeks BS, 5 weeks JB)
- Charles Brown (13 weeks BS, 14 weeks JB)
- The Clovers (8 weeks BS, 3 weeks JB)
- The Dominoes (14 weeks BS, 12 weeks JB)
- The Five Keys (4 weeks BS, 2 weeks JB)
- Lloyd Glenn (2 weeks JB)
- Peppermint Harris (1 week BS, 2 weeks JB)
- John Lee Hooker (4 weeks JB)
- Amos Milburn (1 week BS, 3 weeks JB)
- Jimmy Nelson (1 week JB)
- Tab Smith (2 weeks BS)

== 1952 ==
- Johnny Ace (9 weeks BS)
- Eddie Boyd (2 weeks BS, 7 weeks JB)
- Ruth Brown (7 weeks BS, 6 weeks JB)
- Tommy Brown with The Griffin Brothers (3 weeks JB)
- The Clovers (1 week BS, 1 week JB)
- Fats Domino (1 week BS)
- The Dominoes (7 weeks BS, 10 weeks JB)
- Jimmy Forrest (6 weeks BS, 7 weeks JB)
- The Four Blazes (3 weeks JB)
- Rosco Gordon (1 week BS)
- B. B. King (7 weeks BS, 5 weeks JB)
- Little Walter (1 week BS, 8 weeks JB)
- Willie Mabon (8 weeks BS, 7 weeks JB)
- Lloyd Price (7 weeks BS, 1 week JB)
- Johnnie Ray (1 week BS, 1 week JB)

== 1953 ==
- Johnny Ace (5 weeks BS, 4 weeks JB)
- Faye Adams (9 weeks BS, 10 weeks JB)
- Ruth Brown (5 weeks BS, 5 weeks JB)
- The "5" Royales (8 weeks BS, 8 weeks JB)
- B.B. King (3 weeks JB)
- Willie Mabon (2 weeks BS)
- Clyde McPhatter and The Drifters (11 weeks BS, 1 week JB)
- The Orioles (4 weeks BS, 5 weeks JB)
- Big Mama Thornton (6 weeks BS, 7 weeks JB)
- Big Joe Turner (8 weeks JB)

== 1954 ==
- Faye Adams (6 weeks BS, 5 weeks JB)
- Ruth Brown (5 weeks BS, 9 weeks JB)
- The Charms (9 weeks BS, 2 weeks JB, 2 weeks JY)
- Clyde McPhatter and The Drifters (8 weeks BS, 8 weeks JB)
- Guitar Slim (6 weeks BS, 14 weeks JB)
- Roy Hamilton (8 weeks BS, 5 weeks JB)
- B.B. King (2 weeks JB)
- The Midnighters (9 weeks BS, 4 weeks JB)
- Big Joe Turner (3 weeks JB)

== 1955 ==
- Johnny Ace (9 weeks BS, 9 weeks JB, 10 weeks JY)
- Chuck Berry (9 weeks BS, 11 weeks JB, 9 weeks JY)
- Ray Charles (1 week JB, 1 week JY)
- Bo Diddley (2 weeks JB)
- Fats Domino (11 weeks BS, 8 weeks JB, 10 weeks JY)
- The Drifters (1 week JB)
- Roy Hamilton (3 weeks BS)
- Al Hibbler (1 week JB)
- Etta James (4 weeks JY)
- Little Walter ( 4 weeks BS, 5 weeks JB, 2 weeks JY)
- Jay McShann (3 weeks BS, 2 weeks JB, 2 weeks JY)
- The Moonglows (2 weeks JB, 1 week JY)
- The Penguins (3 weeks BS, 3 weeks JB, 1 week JY)
- The Platters (7 weeks BS, 6 weeks JB, 5 weeks JY)

== 1956 ==
- Ray Charles (2 weeks JB, 1 week JY)
- Bill Doggett (13 weeks BS, 1 week JB, 5 weeks JY)
- Fats Domino (15 weeks BS, 17 weeks JB, 20 weeks JY)
- The El Dorados (1 week JB)
- Little Willie John (3 weeks BS, 1 week JB, 5 weeks JY)
- Little Richard (8 weeks BS, 9 weeks JB, 5 weeks JY)
- Frankie Lymon and The Teenagers (5 weeks BS, 2 weeks JY)
- Clyde McPhatter (1 week JB)
- The Platters (10 weeks BS, 11 weeks JB, 13 weeks JY)
- Elvis Presley (1 week BS, 6 weeks JB)
- Shirley and Lee (3 weeks JB, 3 weeks JY)

== 1957 ==
- Paul Anka (2 weeks BS)
- LaVern Baker (1 week JY)
- Chuck Berry (1 week BS, 1 week JB, 5 weeks JY)
- Bobby Bland (2 weeks JY)
- The Bobbettes (4 weeks JY)
- The Coasters (13 weeks BS, 2 weeks JB, 7 weeks JY)
- Nat "King" Cole (2 weeks JY)
- Sam Cooke (6 weeks BS, 6 weeks JY)
- Fats Domino (14 weeks BS, 13 weeks JB, 12 weeks JY)
- The Everly Brothers (1 week JY)
- Ivory Joe Hunter (3 weeks JB, 1 week JY)
- Jerry Lee Lewis (2 weeks BS, 1 week JY)
- Little Richard (2 weeks JB)
- Clyde McPhatter (1 week JY)
- Mickey & Sylvia (2 weeks JY)
- Elvis Presley (10 weeks BS, 4 weeks JB, 5 weeks JY)
- Jimmie Rodgers (2 weeks BS, 1 week JY)
- Larry Williams (1 week JY)
- Chuck Willis (2 weeks JY)

== 1958 ==
- Chuck Berry (3 weeks BS, 3 weeks JY)
- The Champs (4 weeks BS, 4 weeks JY)
- Jimmy Clanton (1 week BS)
- The Coasters (7 weeks BS, 6 weeks JY)
- Cozy Cole (6 weeks)
- Sam Cooke (1 week JY)
- Danny & The Juniors (5 weeks BS)
- Bobby Darin (2 weeks JY)
- Bobby Day (3 weeks JY)
- Tommy Edwards (3 weeks BS)
- The Elegants (4 weeks BS, 4 weeks JY)
- The Everly Brothers (5 weeks BS, 3 weeks JY)
- Ernie Freeman (2 weeks JY)
- Bill Justis (1 week JY)
- The Kalin Twins (1 week JY)
- Clyde McPhatter (1 week)
- The Platters (3 weeks BS)
- Perez Prado (2 weeks BS, 1 week JY)
- Elvis Presley (3 weeks JY)
- David Seville (1 week JY)
- The Silhouettes (4 weeks BS, 6 weeks JY)
- Chuck Willis (1 week JY)
- Jackie Wilson (7 weeks)

== 1959 ==
- Brook Benton (16 weeks)
- James Brown (1 week)
- Ray Charles (1 week)
- The Coasters (4 weeks)
- Fats Domino (1 week)
- The Drifters (1 week)
- Wilbert Harrison (7 weeks)
- Phil Phillips (1 week)
- Lloyd Price (11 weeks)
- Della Reese (2 weeks)
- The Spacemen (3 weeks)
- Jackie Wilson (1 week)

== 1960 ==
- Hank Ballard and The Midnighters (3 weeks)
- Brook Benton (23 weeks, inc. 14 weeks with Dinah Washington)
- Bill Black (8 weeks)
- Buster Brown (1 week)
- Jerry Butler (7 weeks)
- The Drifters (1 week)
- The Everly Brothers (1 week)
- Bobby Marchan (1 week)
- Dinah Washington (15 weeks, inc. 14 weeks with Brook Benton)
- Jackie Wilson (7 weeks)

== 1961 ==
- Bobby Bland (1 week)
- Ray Charles (6 weeks)
- Chubby Checker (2 weeks)
- Lee Dorsey (1 week)
- The Jive Five (3 weeks)
- Ernie K-Doe (5 weeks)
- Ben E. King (4 weeks)
- Bobby Lewis (10 weeks)
- The Marcels (2 weeks)
- The Marvelettes (7 weeks)
- The Miracles (8 weeks)
- The Pips (1 week)

== 1962 ==
- Booker T. & the MGs (4 weeks)
- Gene Chandler (5 weeks)
- Ray Charles (15 weeks)
- Sam Cooke (3 weeks)
- King Curtis (2 weeks)
- The Four Seasons (1 week)
- Barbara George (4 weeks)
- Little Eva (3 weeks)
- Barbara Lynn (3 weeks)
- Esther Phillips (3 weeks)
- Dee Dee Sharp (4 weeks)
- Mary Wells (1 week)

== 1963 ==
- Bobby Bland (2 weeks)
- The Chiffons (4 weeks)
- Sam Cooke (1 week)
- The Essex (2 weeks)
- Jimmy Gilmer and the Fireballs (1 week)
- Lesley Gore (3 weeks)
- The Impressions (2 weeks)
- Barbara Lewis (2 weeks)
- Little Peggy March (1 week)
- Martha and the Vandellas (4 weeks)
- Garnet Mimms and the Enchanters (3 weeks)
- The Miracles (1 week)
- Paul and Paula (2 weeks)
- Ruby and the Romantics (2 weeks)
- Jimmy Soul (1 week)
- Little Johnny Taylor (1 week)
- Mary Wells (4 weeks)
- Jackie Wilson (3 weeks)
- Little Stevie Wonder (6 weeks)

== 1964 ==
NOTE: No R&B charts were published between November 1963 and January 1965. The following R&B artists (as assessed by Joel Whitburn) had No. 1 hits on the Billboard Hot 100 pop chart during that period :

- The Dixie Cups (3 weeks)
- The Shangri-Las (1 week)
- The Supremes (6 weeks)
- Mary Wells (2 weeks)

== 1965 ==
- Fontella Bass (4 weeks)
- James Brown (14 weeks)
- Solomon Burke (3 weeks)
- The Four Tops (9 weeks)
- Marvin Gaye (2 weeks)
- Little Milton (3 weeks)
- Wilson Pickett (1 week)
- The Supremes (1 week)
- The Temptations (6 weeks)
- Joe Tex (3 weeks)
- Jr. Walker & the All Stars (4 weeks)

== 1966 ==
- James Brown (2 weeks)
- Ray Charles (1 week)
- Eddie Floyd (1 week)
- The Four Tops (2 weeks)
- Slim Harpo (2 weeks)
- Wilson Pickett (8 weeks)
- Lou Rawls (1 week)
- Sam & Dave (1 week)
- Percy Sledge (4 weeks)
- The Supremes (6 weeks)
- The Temptations (16 weeks)
- Joe Tex (1 week)
- Stevie Wonder (6 weeks)

== 1967 ==
- James Brown (3 weeks)
- Aretha Franklin (17 weeks)
- Gladys Knight & The Pips (6 weeks)
- Martha and the Vandellas (1 week)
- Aaron Neville (5 weeks)
- Wilson Pickett (1 week)
- Sam & Dave (7 weeks)
- Freddie Scott (4 weeks)
- The Supremes (2 weeks)
- Bettye Swann (2 weeks)
- Jackie Wilson (1 week)
- Stevie Wonder (4 weeks)

== 1968 ==
- Archie Bell & The Drells (2 weeks)
- James Brown (8 weeks)
- Jerry Butler (1 week)
- The Dells (3 weeks)
- Aretha Franklin (10 weeks)
- Marvin Gaye (13 weeks, inc. 6 weeks with Tammi Terrell)
- The Intruders (1 week)
- Hugh Masekela (4 weeks)
- Otis Redding (3 weeks)
- Smokey Robinson & The Miracles (1 week)
- Johnnie Taylor (3 weeks)
- The Temptations (4 weeks)
- Stevie Wonder (1 week)

== 1969 ==
- James Brown (4 weeks)
- Jerry Butler (2 weeks)
- Tyrone Davis (3 weeks)
- The Dells (1 week)
- Aretha Franklin (5 weeks)
- Marvin Gaye (6 weeks)
- The Impressions (1 week)
- The Isley Brothers (4 weeks)
- The Originals (5 weeks)
- Diana Ross and The Supremes (4 weeks)
- Joe Simon (3 weeks)
- Sly & The Family Stone (2 weeks)
- The Temptations (7 weeks)
- Jr. Walker & the All Stars (2 weeks)

== 1970 ==
- Brook Benton (1 week)
- James Brown (2 weeks)
- Tyrone Davis (2 weeks)
- Aretha Franklin (5 weeks)
- The Jackson Five (20 weeks)
- The Moments (5 weeks)
- Smokey Robinson & The Miracles (3 weeks)
- Diana Ross (1 week)
- Sly & The Family Stone (5 weeks)
- The Supremes (1 week)
- Stevie Wonder (6 weeks)

== 1971 ==
- James Brown (3 weeks)
- The Chi-Lites (2 weeks)
- King Floyd (4 weeks)
- Aretha Franklin (5 weeks)
- Marvin Gaye (9 weeks)
- The Honey Cone (5 weeks)
- The Jackson Five (3 weeks)
- Gladys Knight & The Pips (1 week)
- Jean Knight (5 weeks)
- Denise LaSalle (1 week)
- The Persuaders (2 weeks)
- Wilson Pickett (1 week)
- Sly & The Family Stone (5 weeks)
- Johnnie Taylor (2 weeks)
- The Temptations (3 weeks)
- Rufus Thomas (2 weeks)

== 1972 ==
- James Brown (5 weeks)
- The Chi-Lites (2 weeks)
- The Dramatics (4 weeks)
- Roberta Flack and Donny Hathaway (1 week)
- Aretha Franklin (2 weeks)
- Al Green (12 weeks)
- Luther Ingram (4 weeks)
- Harold Melvin & the Blue Notes (2 weeks)
- The O'Jays (1 week)
- Billy Paul (4 weeks)
- Billy Preston (1 week)
- Joe Simon (2 weeks)
- The Spinners (5 weeks)
- The Staple Singers (4 weeks)
- Joe Tex (1 week)
- Bill Withers (1 week)
- Bobby Womack (1 week)

== 1973 ==
- Aretha Franklin (2 weeks)
- Marvin Gaye (6 weeks)
- The Independents (1 week)
- Eddie Kendricks (2 weeks)
- Gladys Knight & The Pips (8 weeks)
- Harold Melvin & the Blue Notes (2 weeks)
- The Ohio Players (1 week)
- The O'Jays (4 weeks)
- Billy Preston (1 week)
- The Spinners (5 weeks)
- The Staple Singers (3 weeks)
- Sylvia (2 weeks)
- Johnnie Taylor (2 weeks)
- The Temptations (2 weeks)
- Timmy Thomas (2 weeks)
- Fred Wesley & The J.B.s (2 weeks)
- Barry White (2 weeks)
- Stevie Wonder (6 weeks)

== 1974 ==
- Blue Magic (1 week)
- James Brown (5 weeks)
- Shirley Brown (2 weeks)
- B.T. Express (1 week)
- William DeVaughn (1 week)
- Roberta Flack (5 weeks)
- Aretha Franklin (3 weeks)
- Al Green (1 week)
- The Impressions (2 weeks)
- The Jackson Five (1 week)
- Eddie Kendricks (3 weeks)
- Gladys Knight & The Pips (5 weeks)
- Kool & The Gang (2 weeks)
- Latimore (2 weeks)
- George McCrae (2 weeks)
- MFSB featuring The Three Degrees (1 week)
- Rufus featuring Chaka Khan (1 week)
- The Spinners (2 weeks)
- Tavares (1 week)
- The Temptations (1 week)
- Barry White (3 weeks)
- Bobby Womack (3 weeks)
- Stevie Wonder (4 weeks)

== 1975 ==
- B.T. Express (1 week)
- Natalie Cole (2 weeks)
- The Commodores (1 week)
- Carl Douglas (1 week)
- Earth, Wind & Fire (2 weeks)
- Faith Hope & Charity (1 week)
- Graham Central Station (1 week)
- Al Green (3 weeks)
- Major Harris (1 week)
- The Isley Brothers (3 weeks)
- K.C. & The Sunshine Band (2 weeks)
- Eddie Kendricks (1 week)
- Ben E. King (1 week)
- Kool & The Gang (1 week)
- LaBelle (1 week)
- Love Unlimited (1 week)
- Van McCoy (1 week)
- Gwen McCrae (1 week)
- The Moments (1 week)
- New Birth (1 week)
- The Ohio Players (4 weeks)
- The O'Jays (2 weeks)
- Sharon Paige with Harold Melvin & the Blue Notes (1 week)
- Peoples Choice (1 week)
- The Pointer Sisters (2 weeks)
- Smokey Robinson (1 week)
- Shirley and Company (1 week)
- Silver Convention (1 week)
- Joe Simon (2 weeks)
- The Spinners (1 week)
- The Staple Singers (2 weeks)
- Tavares (1 week)
- The Temptations (2 weeks)
- War (1 week)
- Barry White (2 weeks)

== 1976 ==
- Brass Construction (1 week)
- Brick (4 weeks)
- The Brothers Johnson (1 week)
- Natalie Cole (2 weeks)
- The Commodores (2 weeks)
- Tyrone Davis (1 week)
- Earth, Wind & Fire (4 weeks)
- Aretha Franklin (4 weeks)
- Marvin Gaye (1 week)
- K.C. & The Sunshine Band (4 weeks)
- L.T.D. (2 weeks)
- The Manhattans (1 week)
- Marilyn McCoo and Billy Davis Jr. (1 week)
- Harold Melvin & the Blue Notes (2 weeks)
- The Ohio Players (1 week)
- The O'Jays (3 weeks)
- Lou Rawls (2 weeks)
- Rose Royce (2 weeks)
- Diana Ross (1 week)
- David Ruffin (1 week)
- Rufus featuring Chaka Khan (2 weeks)
- The Spinners (1 week)
- Candi Staton (1 week)
- The Sylvers (1 week)
- Johnnie Taylor (6 weeks)
- Wild Cherry (2 weeks)

== 1977 ==
- William Bell (1 week)
- The Brothers Johnson (1 week)
- Natalie Cole (5 weeks)
- The Commodores (1 week)
- Earth, Wind & Fire (7 weeks)
- The Emotions (4 weeks)
- The Floaters (6 weeks)
- Aretha Franklin (1 week)
- Marvin Gaye (5 weeks)
- Thelma Houston (1 week)
- The Isley Brothers (1 week)
- K.C. & The Sunshine Band (1 week)
- L.T.D. (2 weeks)
- The O'Jays (1 week)
- Rufus featuring Chaka Khan (2 weeks)
- Slave (1 week)
- Tavares (1 week)
- Barry White (5 weeks)
- Stevie Wonder (6 weeks)

== 1978 ==
- Bootsy's Rubber Band (1 week)
- Chic (5 weeks)
- Natalie Cole (2 weeks)
- The Commodores (3 weeks)
- Con Funk Shun (2 weeks)
- Earth, Wind & Fire (1 week)
- Enchantment (1 week)
- Roberta Flack and Donny Hathaway (2 weeks)
- Foxy (2 weeks)
- Funkadelic (6 weeks)
- The Isley Brothers (2 weeks)
- Rick James (2 weeks)
- Quincy Jones (1 week)
- Chaka Khan (3 weeks)
- L.T.D. (2 weeks)
- Johnny Mathis and Deniece Williams (4 weeks)
- The O'Jays (5 weeks)
- Parliament (3 weeks)
- Teddy Pendergrass (2 weeks)
- Stargard (2 weeks)
- A Taste Of Honey (1 week)

== 1979 ==
- Chuck Brown & The Soul Searchers (4 weeks)
- Chic (6 weeks)
- The Commodores (1 week)
- Earth, Wind & Fire (1 week)
- Funkadelic (3 weeks)
- G.Q. (2 weeks)
- Instant Funk (3 weeks)
- The Isley Brothers (1 week)
- Michael Jackson (5 weeks)
- Kool & The Gang (3 weeks)
- Cheryl Lynn (1 week)
- McFadden & Whitehead (1 week)
- Parliament (4 weeks)
- Peaches & Herb (4 weeks)
- Prince (2 weeks)
- Rufus and Chaka Khan (3 weeks)
- Sister Sledge (2 weeks)
- Donna Summer (1 week)
- Anita Ward (5 weeks)

== 1980 ==
- George Benson (3 weeks)
- The Brothers Johnson (2 weeks)
- Tom Browne (4 weeks)
- Larry Graham (2 weeks)
- The Isley Brothers (4 weeks)
- Jermaine Jackson (6 weeks)
- Michael Jackson (6 weeks)
- Kool & The Gang (6 weeks)
- Ray, Goodman & Brown (1 week)
- Diana Ross (4 weeks)
- Shalamar (1 week)
- The S.O.S. Band (5 weeks)
- The Whispers (5 weeks)
- Stevie Wonder (7 weeks)

== 1981 ==
- Earth, Wind & Fire (8 weeks)
- The Four Tops (2 weeks)
- The Gap Band (2 weeks)
- Rick James (5 weeks)
- Chaka Khan (2 weeks)
- Evelyn King (1 week)
- Kool & The Gang (1 week)
- Lakeside (2 weeks)
- Ray Parker Jr. & Raydio (2 weeks)
- Smokey Robinson (5 weeks)
- Roger (2 weeks)
- Diana Ross and Lionel Richie (7 weeks)
- Frankie Smith (4 weeks)
- A Taste Of Honey (1 week)
- Luther Vandross (2 weeks)
- Yarbrough & Peoples (5 weeks)

== 1982 ==
- George Benson (1 week)
- The Dazz Band (5 weeks)
- Richard "Dimples" Fields (3 weeks)
- Aretha Franklin (4 weeks)
- The Gap Band (3 weeks)
- Marvin Gaye (10 weeks)
- Daryl Hall & John Oates (1 week)
- Jennifer Holliday (4 weeks)
- Evelyn King (5 weeks)
- Skyy (2 weeks)
- Deniece Williams (2 weeks)
- Stevie Wonder (9 weeks)
- Zapp (2 weeks)

== 1983 ==
- George Clinton (4 weeks)
- DeBarge (5 weeks)
- Aretha Franklin (2 weeks)
- The Gap Band (1 week)
- Michael Jackson (13 weeks, inc. 3 weeks with Paul McCartney)
- Rick James (6 weeks)
- Gladys Knight & The Pips (1 week)
- Mtume (8 weeks)
- New Edition (1 week)
- Lionel Richie (7 weeks)
- Rufus and Chaka Khan (1 week)
- Donna Summer (3 weeks)

== 1984 ==
- Ashford & Simpson (3 weeks)
- Cameo (4 weeks)
- Chaka Khan (3 weeks)
- Kool & The Gang (2 weeks)
- Patti LaBelle (4 weeks)
- Cheryl Lynn (1 week)
- Midnight Star (5 weeks)
- New Edition (1 week)
- O'Bryan (1 week)
- Billy Ocean (4 weeks)
- Ray Parker Jr. (2 weeks)
- Prince (9 weeks)
- Lionel Richie (3 weeks)
- Rockwell (5 weeks)
- Deniece Williams (3 weeks)
- Stevie Wonder (3 weeks)
- Yarbrough & Peoples (1 week)

== 1985 ==
- The Commodores (4 weeks)
- DeBarge (1 week)
- Aretha Franklin (5 weeks)
- Whitney Houston (2 weeks)
- Isley Jasper Isley (3 weeks)
- Freddie Jackson (8 weeks)
- Kool & The Gang (2 weeks)
- Loose Ends (1 week)
- Maze featuring Frankie Beverly (2 weeks)
- New Edition (3 weeks)
- Ready For The World (2 weeks)
- Rene & Angela (2 weeks)
- Diana Ross (3 weeks)
- USA for Africa (2 weeks)
- Eugene Wilde (4 weeks)
- Stevie Wonder (6 weeks)

== 1986 ==
- Gregory Abbott (2 weeks)
- Bobby Brown (2 weeks)
- Cameo (3 weeks)
- Jean Carn (2 weeks)
- El DeBarge (1 week)
- Gwen Guthrie (1 week)
- Whitney Houston (1 week)
- Freddie Jackson (5 weeks inc. 1 week with Melba Moore)
- Janet Jackson (4 weeks)
- Oran "Juice" Jones (2 weeks)
- Shirley Jones (2 weeks)
- Patti LaBelle & Michael McDonald (4 weeks)
- Levert (1 week)
- Stephanie Mills (2 weeks)
- Melba Moore with Freddie Jackson (1 week)
- Meli'sa Morgan (3 weeks)
- Billy Ocean (3 weeks)
- Prince (4 weeks)
- Ready For The World (2 weeks)
- Rene & Angela (1 week)
- Lionel Richie (2 weeks)
- Timex Social Club (2 weeks)
- Dionne Warwick with Elton John, Gladys Knight and Stevie Wonder (3 weeks)

== 1987 ==
- Herb Alpert with Janet Jackson (2 weeks)
- Atlantic Starr (2 weeks)
- Cameo (2 weeks)
- Earth, Wind & Fire (1 week)
- Force M.D.'s (2 weeks)
- Freddie Jackson (3 weeks)
- Janet Jackson (5 weeks, inc. 2 with Herb Alpert)
- Michael Jackson (8 weeks)
- Levert (2 weeks)
- Lisa Lisa and Cult Jam (3 weeks)
- L.L. Cool J (1 week)
- Loose Ends (1 week)
- Stephanie Mills (4 weeks)
- Melba Moore (1 week)
- The O'Jays (1 week)
- Alexander O'Neal (2 weeks)
- Prince (3 weeks)
- Roger (1 week)
- The System (1 week)
- Luther Vandross (3 weeks, inc. 1 with Gregory Hines)
- Jody Watley (3 weeks)
- The Whispers (1 week)
- Angela Winbush (2 weeks)
- Stevie Wonder (2 weeks)

== 1988 ==
- Al B. Sure! (5 weeks)
- Anita Baker (2 weeks)
- The Boys (1 week)
- Bobby Brown (4 weeks)
- Cherrelle (1 week)
- Terence Trent D'Arby (1 week)
- Morris Day (2 weeks)
- E.U. (1 week)
- Freddie Jackson (4 weeks)
- Michael Jackson (2 weeks)
- Rick James feat. Roxanne Shante (1 week)
- Johnny Kemp (2 weeks)
- Gladys Knight & The Pips (1 week)
- Levert (2 weeks)
- The Mac Band featuring the McCampbell Brothers (1 week)
- Teena Marie (1 week)
- Ziggy Marley & The Melody Makers (2 weeks)
- George Michael (1 week)
- Billy Ocean (1 week)
- Jeffrey Osborne (1 week)
- Pebbles (3 weeks)
- Teddy Pendergrass (2 weeks)
- Cheryl Pepsii Riley (1 week)
- Sade (1 week)
- Keith Sweat (3 weeks)
- Tony! Toni! Tone! (1 week)
- Luther Vandross (1 week)
- Karyn White (1 week)
- Stevie Wonder (1 week)

== 1989 ==
- Atlantic Starr (1 week)
- Babyface (2 weeks)
- Anita Baker (1 week)
- Regina Belle (1 week)
- Chuckii Booker (1 week)
- The Boys (1 week)
- Bobby Brown (2 weeks)
- Peabo Bryson (1 week)
- Natalie Cole (1 week)
- De La Soul (1 week)
- Roberta Flack (1 week)
- Eric Gable (1 week)
- The Gap Band (2 weeks)
- Miki Howard (1 week)
- Janet Jackson (2 weeks)
- Jermaine Jackson (1 week)
- Levert (1 week)
- Maze feat. Frankie Beverly (2 weeks)
- Stephanie Mills (2 weeks)
- New Edition (2 weeks)
- The O'Jays (2 weeks)
- Prince (1 week)
- Teddy Riley feat. Guy (1 week)
- Skyy (2 weeks)
- Soul II Soul (3 weeks)
- Surface (5 weeks)
- Today (1 week)
- Luther Vandross (2 weeks)
- Jody Watley (1 week)
- Karyn White (5 weeks)
- Vanessa Williams (2 weeks)

== 1990 ==
- After 7 (3 weeks)
- Al B. Sure! (2 weeks, inc. 1 week with Quincy Jones)
- Babyface (1 week)
- Bell Biv DeVoe (3 weeks)
- Regina Belle (1 week)
- The Boys (1 week)
- Mariah Carey (3 weeks)
- En Vogue (3 weeks)
- Johnny Gill (5 weeks, inc. 2 weeks with Stacy Lattisaw)
- Whitney Houston (2 weeks)
- Janet Jackson (2 weeks)
- Quincy Jones (4 weeks, inc. 2 weeks with Ray Charles and Chaka Khan; 1 week with Al B. Sure!, James Ingram, El DeBarge and Barry White; 1 week with Tevin Campbell)
- Stacy Lattisaw with Johnny Gill (2 weeks)
- M.C. Hammer (1 week)
- Pebbles (3 weeks)
- Prince (1 week)
- Samuelle (2 weeks)
- Skyy (1 week)
- Lisa Stansfield (3 weeks)
- Keith Sweat (1 week)
- The Time (1 week)
- Tony! Toni! Tone! (6 weeks)
- Ralph Tresvant (1 week)
- Troop (3 weeks)
- Ruby Turner (1 week)

== 1991 ==
- Boyz II Men (1 week)
- Peabo Bryson (2 weeks)
- Mariah Carey (1 week)
- C & C Music Factory feat. Freedom Williams (1 week)
- Color Me Badd (3 weeks)
- Damian Dame (2 weeks)
- DJ Jazzy Jeff & the Fresh Prince (1 week)
- En Vogue (1 week)
- Lisa Fischer (2 weeks)
- Johnny Gill (1 week)
- Hi-Five (3 weeks)
- Whitney Houston (2 weeks)
- Phyllis Hyman (1 week)
- Freddie Jackson (3 weeks)
- Jodeci (2 weeks)
- Levert (1 week)
- Gerald Levert (1 week)
- Lisa Lisa and Cult Jam (1 week)
- Pebbles (2 weeks)
- Teddy Pendergrass (1 week)
- Phil Perry (1 week)
- The Rude Boys (2 weeks)
- Shanice (4 weeks)
- Tracie Spencer (1 week)
- Surface (1 week)
- Keith Sweat (1 week)
- Tony! Toni! Tone! (2 weeks)
- Luther Vandross (2 weeks)
- Keith Washington (1 week)
- Karyn White (1 week)
- Christopher Williams (1 week)
- Vanessa Williams (2 weeks)
- BeBe & CeCe Winans (3 weeks, inc. 1 week feat. Mavis Staples)

== 1992 ==
- Al B. Sure! (1 week)
- Mariah Carey (3 weeks)
- Arrested Development (1 week)
- Mary J. Blige (3 weeks)
- Chuckii Booker (1 week)
- Boyz II Men (5 weeks)
- Bobby Brown (2 weeks)
- Tevin Campbell (2 weeks)
- En Vogue (3 weeks)
- Aaron Hall (2 weeks)
- Whitney Houston (11 weeks)
- Miki Howard (1 week)
- Michael Jackson (3 weeks)
- Jodeci (4 weeks)
- Glenn Jones (1 week)
- R. Kelly and Public Announcement (3 weeks)
- Gerald Levert (1 week)
- Lo-Key? (1 week)
- Prince (1 week)
- Lionel Richie (1 week)
- Lisa Stansfield (1 week)
- Keith Sweat (2 weeks)
- TLC (2 weeks)
- Troop (1 week)
- Luther Vandross and Janet Jackson with BBD and Ralph Tresvant (1 week)
- Vanessa Williams (3 weeks)

== 1993 ==
- Tevin Campbell (3 weeks)
- Dr. Dre featuring Snoop Doggy Dogg (2 weeks)
- D.R.S. (6 weeks)
- Mariah Carey (10 weeks)
- H-Town (4 weeks)
- Ice Cube featuring Das EFX (1 week)
- Janet Jackson (4 weeks)
- Jodeci (4 weeks)
- Naughty By Nature (1 week)
- Silk (8 weeks)
- SWV (Sisters With Voices) (9 weeks)
- Tag Team (1 week)
- Xscape (4 weeks)

== 1994 ==
- Aaliyah (3 weeks)
- Mariah Carey (2 weeks)
- Boyz II Men (9 weeks)
- Brandy (4 weeks)
- Janet Jackson (10 weeks)
- Jodeci (4 weeks)
- R. Kelly (12 weeks)
- TLC (9 weeks)
- Barry White (3 weeks)
- Xscape (2 weeks)

== 1995 ==
- Brandy (4 weeks)
- Mariah Carey (6 weeks)
- Whitney Houston (8 weeks)
- Michael Jackson (4 weeks)
- Montell Jordan (7 weeks)
- R. Kelly (1 week)
- Method Man feat. Mary J. Blige (3 weeks)
- Monica (2 weeks)
- The Notorious B.I.G. (9 weeks)
- Shaggy (1 week)
- Soul For Real (3 weeks)
- Xscape (1 week)

== 1996 ==
- Monica (2 weeks)
- Mary J. Blige (5 weeks)
- R. Kelly (15 weeks inc. 1 with Ronald Isley)
- SWV (1 week)
- Mariah Carey (1 week)
- Bone Thugs N Harmony (7 weeks)
- Toni Braxton (2 weeks)
- 2Pac (3 weeks)
- K-Ci & JoJo (3 weeks with 2Pac)
- Roger Troutman (3 weeks with 2Pac)
- Keith Sweat (6 weeks inc. 3 with Athena Cage)
- New Edition (3 weeks)
- Aaliyah (2 weeks)
- Az Yet (1 week)
- Blackstreet (4 weeks)
- Dr. Dre (4 weeks with Blackstreet)
- Ginuwine (2 weeks)

== 1997 ==
- En Vogue (1 week)
- Mariah Carey (3 weeks)
- Erykah Badu (2 weeks)
- Dru Hill (3 weeks)
- Puff Daddy (14 weeks)
- The Notorious B.I.G. (3 weeks)
- Changing Faces (7 weeks)
- Mase (6 weeks with Puff Daddy)
- Faith Evans (8 weeks with Puff Daddy)
- Usher (11 weeks)
- LSG (7 weeks)
- Boyz II Men (2 weeks)
- 112 (8 weeks with Puff Daddy)

== 1998 ==
- Boyz II Men (1 week)
- LSG (2 weeks)
- Usher (8 weeks)
- Destiny's Child (1 week)
- Montell Jordan (3 weeks)
- Next (3 weeks)
- Janet Jackson (2 weeks)
- Brandy (8 weeks)
- Monica (14 weeks)
- Kelly Price (5 weeks)
- Dru Hill (3 weeks)
- Deborah Cox (8 weeks)
