= Deaths in October 1981 =

The following is a list of notable deaths in October 1981.

Entries for each day are listed alphabetically by surname. A typical entry lists information in the following sequence:

- Name, age, country of citizenship at birth, subsequent country of citizenship (if applicable), reason for notability, cause of death (if known), and reference.

== October 1981 ==
=== 2 ===
- Harry Golden, 79, American journalist, political writer, newspaper publisher, and satirist, political activist in favor of Georgism and desegregation. Early in life, Golden was a stockbroker imprisoned for mail fraud. A few decades later, Golden received a full presidential pardon by the then-president Richard Nixon.
- Hazel Scott, 61, an American jazz and classical pianist and singer, she was an outspoken critic of racial discrimination and segregation, In 1950, she became the first Black American to host her own nationally-syndicated television show, The Hazel Scott Show, with the advent of the Red Scare in the television industry, Scott's name appeared in Red Channels: A Report on Communist Influence in Radio and Television (June 1950) and in an effort to clear her name, Scott voluntarily appeared before the House Un-American Activities Committee (HUAC) on September 22, 1950, and insisted on reading a prepared statement, cancer

=== 4 ===
- Dorothy Dare, 70, American actress and singer
- Lloyd Ingles, 80, American zoologist.
- Freddie Lindstrom, 75, American professional baseball player, coach of Northwestern University's baseball team for 13 seasons, and postmaster of Evanston, Illinois until his retirement from office in 1972, along with a 24-game hitting streak in 1930 and a 25-game streak in 1933, Lindstrom also ranks among the all-time top 10 in lifetime strikeouts to batting average ratio, 276 strikeouts to .311 batting average in 6,104 plate appearances.

=== 5 ===
- Gloria Grahame, 57, American actress, primarily associated with the genre of film noir, she was nominated for the Academy Award for Best Supporting Actress for her role in Crossfire (1947), stomach cancer and peritonitis
- Jud Strunk, 45, American singer-songwriter, comedian, private pilot, and failed political candidate, his most popular song was the sentimental ballad Daisy a Day (1972), he was a regular cast member of Rowan & Martin's Laugh-In from 1972 until 1973, killed in an aviation accident. While piloting his final flight, Strunk suffered a heart attack and lost control of his aircraft. The fall to the ground killed both him and his passenger.

=== 6 ===
- Blanche Noyes, 81, American pioneering female aviator, she was among the first ten women to receive a transport pilot's license, in 1929, she became Ohio's first licensed female pilot,she was the first woman awarded a gold medal by the Commerce Department, for 35 years of government service in improving air safety.
- Anwar Sadat, 62, Egyptian politician and military officer, he served as the president from Egypt from 1970 until his death in 1981, and he had previously served two terms as the Vice President of Egypt (1964, 1969-1970), he was assassinated by members of the Egyptian Islamic Jihad during the annual victory parade held in Cairo, his death has been attributed to a conspiracy of Islamic nationalists, anti-imperialists, and pro-Palestinian groups opposed to Sadat's peace initiative with Israel and the United States, relating to the Camp David Accords.

=== 9 ===
- Marilyn Hare, 57, American actress, singer, and television personality, during early 1942, she staged a morale stunt in which she vowed to kiss 10,000 soldiers at a California Army encampment near an aircraft plant, the stunt being part of Hollywood's patriotic exuberance during World War II,she hosted or co-hosted the television shows You’re Never Too Old (1953) and True to Life Theater (1954)

=== 12 ===
- Lawrence Lariar, 72, American crime novelist, cartoonist, and cartoon editor, he briefly worked for the Walt Disney Studios, as one of the staff working on the animated feature film Fantasia (1940),
- Robert McKenzie, 64, Canadian psephologist and academic, he provided televised reports on the British general election results for the BBC from 1955 until 1979, cancer
- Art Passarella, 71, American actor and umpire in Major League Baseball, he umpired in three World Series (1945, 1949 and 1952) and two All-Star Games (1947 and 1951), heart attack

=== 13 ===
- Antonio Berni, 76, Argentine figurative artist, he won initial praise for his impressionist landscape painting and he later became a key representative of an Argentine variant of social realism, he died while working on a Martín Fierro monument

=== 14 ===
- Jim Raymond, 64, American comic strip artist, he served as the lead artist in the comic strip Blondie from 1950 until his death in 1981, and he had previously served as an assistant artist and occasional writer in the same strip since 1935

=== 15 ===
- Zoltán Huszárik, 50, Hungarian film director, screenwriter, visual artist and occasional actor, suicide
- Kendall McComas, 64, American child actor and electrical engineer, he portrayed the recurring characters Stinky Davis in the Mickey McGuire series and Breezy Brisbane in the Our Gang series, he committed suicide in a fit of depression, due to facing mandatory retirement from his job.

=== 16 ===
- Stanley Clements, 55, American actor and comedian, he portrayed the character "Stash" in the East Side Kids film series, and the group leader Stanislaus "Duke" Coveleskie in The Bowery Boys film series, emphysema
- Moshe Dayan, 66, Israeli military leader and politician, he served as the Minister of Defense from 1967 until 1974, with his term in office covering both the Six-Day War (1967) and the Yom Kippur War (1973), he was blamed for the Israeli leadership having missed the signs for the upcoming war and he chose to resign,, he died due to a heart attack, while already hospitalized due to suffering from chest pains and shortness of breath

=== 17 ===
- Kannadasan, 54, Indian poet, lyricist, film producer, and screenwriter, he won the 1980 Sahitya Akademi Award for his novel Cheraman Kathali, and he was the first to receive the National Film Award for Best Lyrics for the film Kuzhanthaikkaga (1968)

=== 19 ===
- Nils Asther, 84, Swedish actor and memoirist, he had a lavender marriage with his co-star Vivian Duncan

=== 20 ===
- Mary Chase, 75, American journalist, playwright, children's novelist, and screenwriter, three of her plays were made into Hollywood films: Sorority House (1939), Harvey (1950), and Bernardine (1957), heart attack

=== 22 ===
- Little Ann Little, 79, American vaudevillian, voice actress, singer, and ordained minister of the Unity Church, primarily known for voicing the character Betty Boop from 1931 until 1933
- Lily Pincus, 83, German-British social worker, marital psychotherapist, and author, she co-founded the Family Discussion Bureau in 1946 (later renamed as the Tavistock Marital Studies Institute and now known as Tavistock Relationships within the Tavistock and Portman NHS Foundation Trust), and she served as the organization's director until 1965, she was a leading writer on bereavement and the importance of mourning

=== 24 ===
- Edith Head, 83, American film costume designer, she received a record 35 nominations for the Academy Award for Best Costume Design and won a record eight times, she was both the most honored and most nominated woman in the Academy's history, she also holds the Guinness World Record for the most-credited costume designer in film history, with a total of 432 credits, complications from myelofibrosis
- John Cecil Holm, 76, American dramatist, theatre director, and actor, he is primarily known for co-writing the play Three Men on a Horse (1935)

=== 25 ===
- Barbara Bedford, 78, American actress of the silent era, she variously worked as an accountant and as a teacher of swimming, dancing, and gymnastics before the start of her film career
- Eric Woodburn, 87, Scottish actor and baritone singer, he portrayed Dr. Alexander Snoddie in Doctor Finlay's Casebook.

=== 26 ===
- Glenn Anders, 92, American actor
- Reinhold Bernt, 78, German actor, assistant director, and screenwriter, he appeared in Nazi propaganda films and post-World War II radio plays

=== 27 ===
- John Warburton, 78, Irish-born British actor, he emigrated to the United States as a stowaway on a freighter, his work on television included appearances on 35 episodes of Fireside Theater. and a role in the Star Trek episode Balance of Terror, cancer

=== 28 ===
- Hiroshi Akutagawa, 61, Japanese actor and director, he received the Mainichi Film Award for his performance in Where Chimneys Are Seen (1953), tuberculosis

=== 29 ===
- Bardu Ali, 75, Bengali American jazz and R&B singer, guitarist, and promoter, business partner of Johnny Otis, co-founder (with Otis) of The Barrelhouse club in 1947, Ali played an important role in the early career of Charles Brown and he served as Redd Foxx's business manager.
- Tina Harmon, 12, American victim of kidnapping, rape, and murder, decades following her death, DNA evidence indicated that Harmon was one of the victims of the child murderer and serial rapist Robert Anthony Buell

== Sources ==
- Jorgensen, Jay (2010). Edith Head: The Fifty-Year Career of Hollywood's Greatest Costume Designer. Philadelphia, Pennsylvania: Running Press. ISBN 978-0-762-43805-1.
- Lentz, Robert J. (2011). Gloria Grahame, Bad Girl of Film Noir: The Complete Career. McFarland & Co. ISBN 978-0-786-43483-1.
