= Gene Conners =

American trombonist (1930–2010)

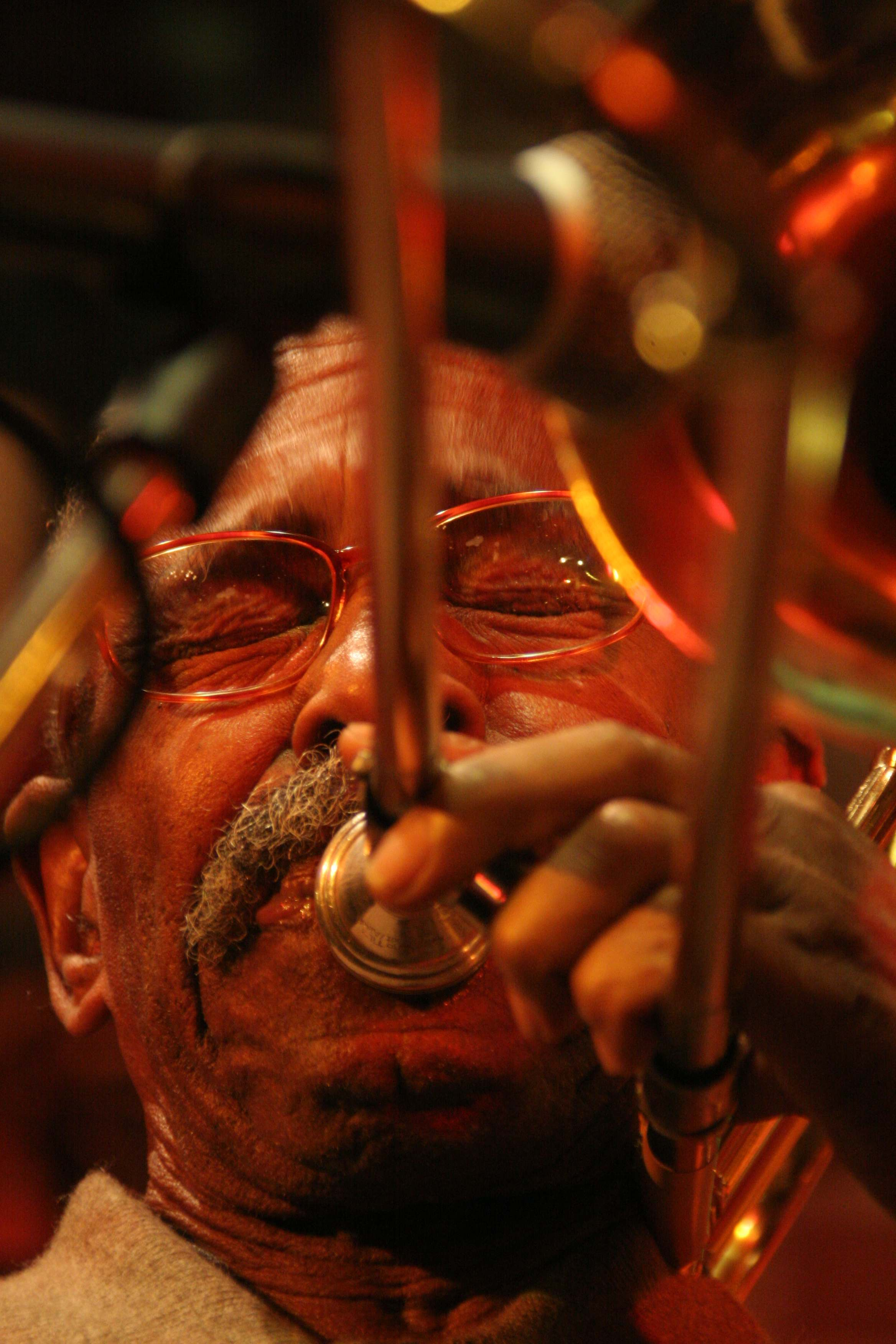
- Conners performing in Wattenscheid, Germany, 2008

Background information
- Also known as: The Mighty Flea
- Born: December 28, 1930; Birmingham, Alabama, U.S.
- Died: June 10, 2010 (aged 79)
- Genres: Jazz
- Occupation: Musician
- Instrument: Trombone

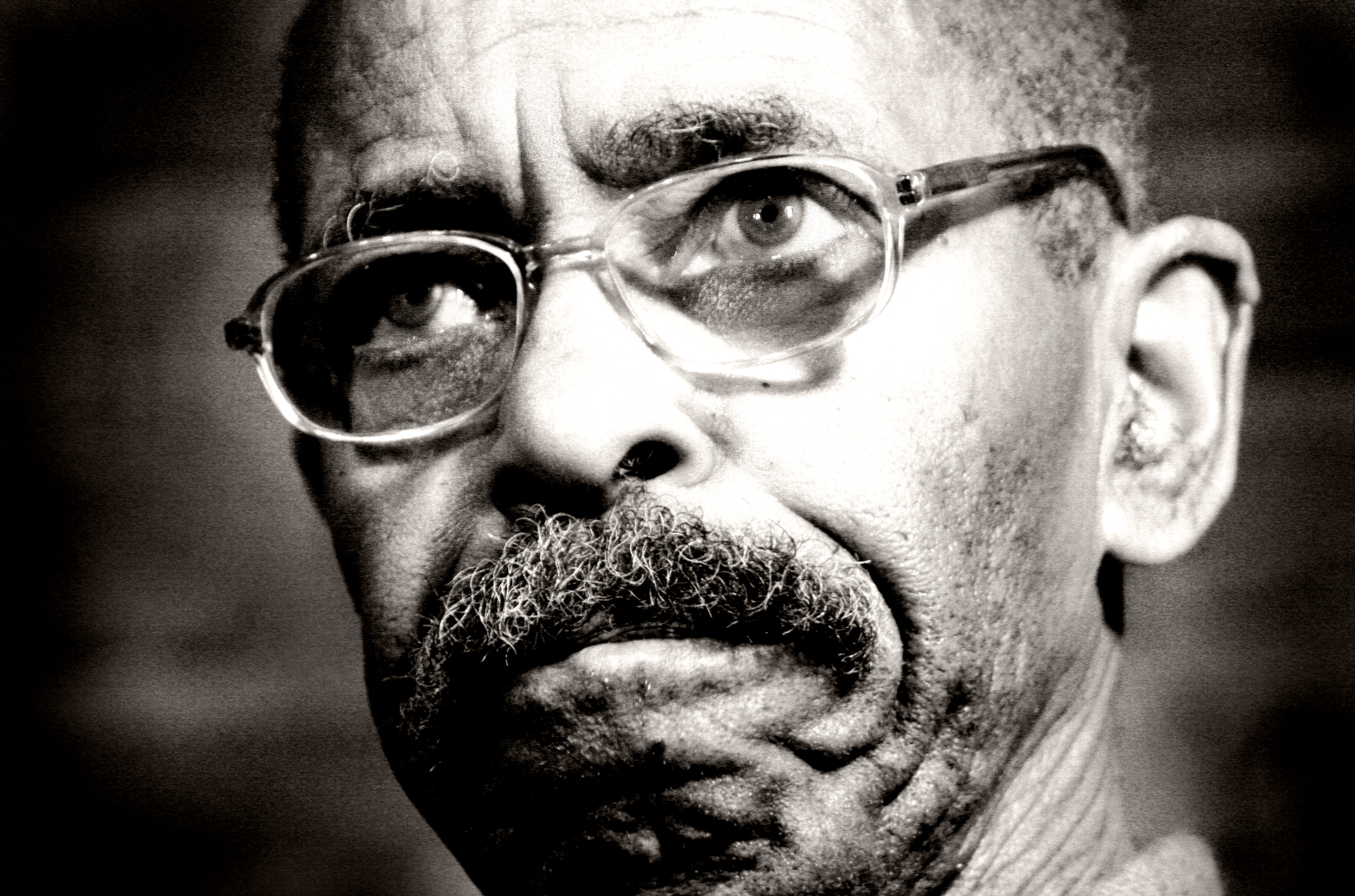
Conners, Germany, 2008

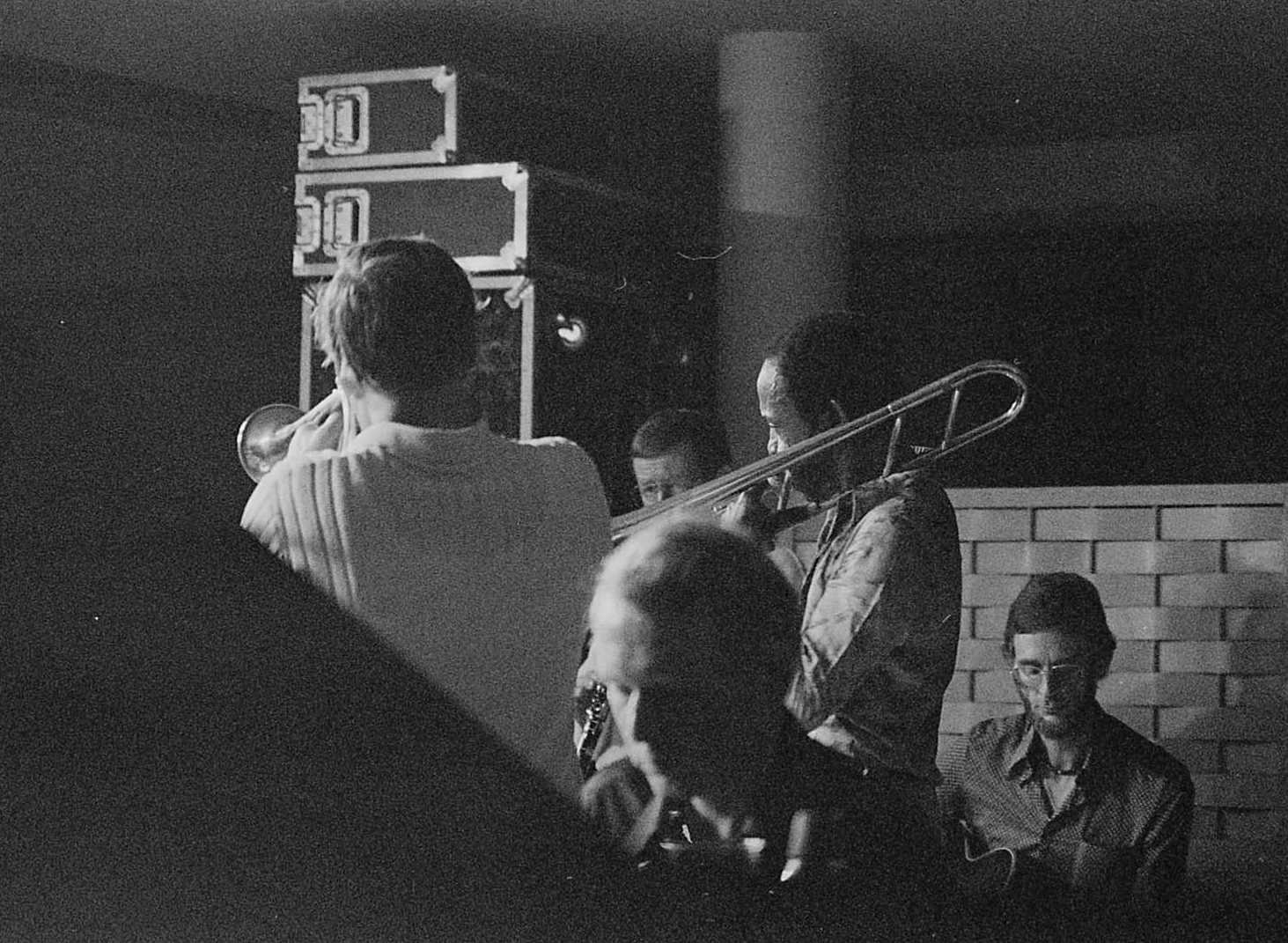
Gene Conners (trombone), North Sea Jazz Festival, late 1970s

Eugene Conners (December 28, 1930 – June 10, 2010), also known as The Mighty Flea, was an American trombonist and singer.

Conners was born in Birmingham, Alabama, United States, and grew up in New Orleans, and may have played with Papa Celestin when he was eleven years old. As a teenager he played at jazz funerals and with territory bands, and served in the Navy during the Korean War. Following this he played with Johnny Otis; his nickname was given to him by Bardu Ali while he was in Otis's band.

Conners played with his own ensemble in Long Beach, California in the 1950s, subsequently played with Ray Charles and Dinah Washington before recording a 1969-1986 boogie woogie various artists album where he doubled on trumpet. In 1969, he returned to work with Otis, playing with him at the Monterey Jazz Festival and appearing in the film Play Misty for Me in 1971. He continued touring the world with Otis through 1974; concomitantly he played in Europe in 1973 with Illinois Jacquet and Jo Jones. In 1975, he appeared at the Montreux Jazz Festival.

He moved to Europe, living in France, Denmark, and Germany, playing in swing jazz, Dixieland, and blues groups. He collaborated with Catalan ensemble La Locomotora Negra in 1983. In this period, too, he recorded in Germany two R&B albums with the English guitarist and songwriter John C. Marshall.

During the 1990s and early 2000s, he once again played with his own ensemble based in Germany, which toured across Europe. In 2008, he was inducted into the Alabama Jazz Hall of Fame. He died on June 10, 2010.

== Discography ==
- Let The Good Times Roll (Big Bear, 1973)
- Coming Home (1976)
- Sanctified (1981)
- Gene Mighty Flea Conners Sings and Plays R&B (1984)
- Jumping the Blues (1995)

== Other sources ==
- Howard Rye, "Gene Conners". Grove Jazz online.
