= Mistrustin' Blues =

Single by Little Esther, Mel Walker
- Released: 1950
- Label: Savoy
- Songwriter: Johnny Otis

"Mistrustin' Blues" is a 1950 song written by Johnny Otis.

== Overview ==
It was sung by Little Esther and Mel Walker, accompanied by The Johnny Otis Orchestra, and released on the Savoy label (catalog no. 735-A). The record was the second collaboration between Johnny Otis and Little Esther. "Mistrustin Blues" was their second number one record on the R&B chart, which it topped for four weeks. It was ranked No. 10 on Billboard magazine's year-end list of R&B records for 1950 based on sales (No. 15 based on juke box plays).

== See also ==
- Billboard Top R&B Records of 1950
