= Spirit of the Black Territory Bands =

Studio album by Johnny Otis
- Released: 1992
- Label: Arhoolie
- Producer: Johnny Otis, Tom Morgan

Johnny Otis chronology
Let's Live It Up (1991)	Spirit of the Black Territory Bands (1992)	Otisology (1995)

Spirit of the Black Territory Bands is an album by the American musician Johnny Otis, credited as Johnny Otis and His Orchestra. It was released in 1992. The album is a tribute to the music of the territory bands of Otis's youth; Otis played with several such bands in the 1940s.

The album was nominated for a Grammy Award for "Best Large Jazz Ensemble Performance".

== Production ==
The album was produced by Otis and Tom Morgan. Otis's son, Shuggie, played guitar and helped to arrange the songs. His other son, Nicky, played drums. Otis employed a 10-piece horn section. The album was largely made up of Count Basie and Duke Ellington songs. The album cover is a painting by Otis.

== Critical reception ==
Professional ratings
Review scores
Source	Rating
AllMusic	3/5 stars
The Encyclopedia of Popular Music	3/5 stars
MusicHound R&B: The Essential Album Guide	2/5 stars

The San Francisco Chronicle wrote that "the arrangements lay curling, fine-point filigree behind blasting individual efforts with a prevailing robust spirit that simply smokes."

AllMusic deemed the album "competent but hardly thrilling." The Penguin Guide to Blues Recordings noted Otis's "continued engagement with jazz," and concluded that "it's unlikely that swing fans will be disappointed."

== Track listing ==
No.	Title	Length
1.	"Swinging the Blues"
2.	"Margie"
3.	"You're Drivin' Me Crazy / Moten Swing"
4.	"The Mooche"
5.	"Flying Home"
6.	"Harlem Nocturne"
7.	"Jumpin' at the Woodside"
8.	"Sophisticated Lady"
9.	"Jumpin' the Blues"
10.	"Creole Love Call"
11.	"Rock-a-Bye Basie"
