= The Barrelhouse =

Nightclub in Los Angeles, California

Coordinates: 33.939009°N 118.239076°W

The Barrelhouse Club, at 107th and Wilmington in Watts, Los Angeles, was a rhythm and blues nightclub opened in 1948 and co-owned by Johnny Otis, Bardu Ali, and Tila Ali.

It was named in honour of the Barrel House in Omaha, Nebraska, the first club in that district to welcome both black and white customers.

== Featured artists ==
Artists who performed at the venue included Mel Walker, Esther Phillips, who first performed there at a talent show, The Robins, The Hollywood Flames, and tenor saxophonist Big Jay McNeely. Many of the performers at the club would join Otis' California Rhythm and Blues Caravan in the early 1950s. Pete "Guitar" Lewis, who played with the Johnny Otis Orchestra between the late 1940s and mid-1950s, also recorded an instrumental, "Midnight in the Barrelhouse" (the flip-side, "Barrelhouse Stomp" was by McNeely), for the Excelsior record label, presumably in honor of the club.
