= John C. Marshall (musician) =

British guitarist, vocalist and songwriter

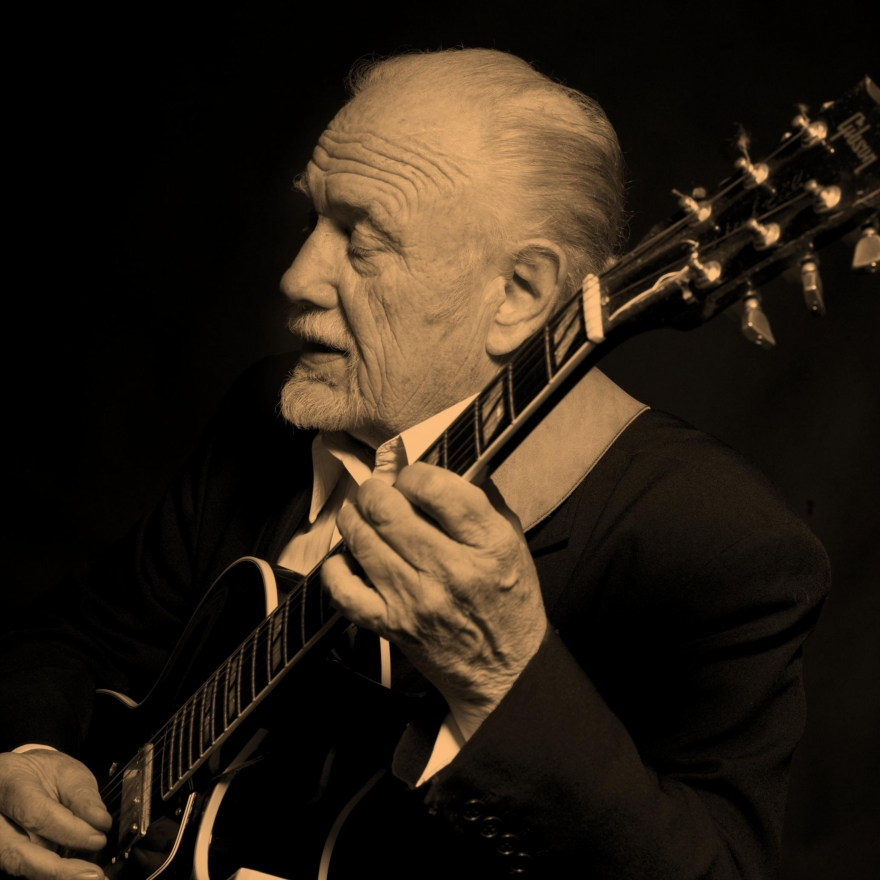
John C. Marshall 2010

John C. Marshall (17 April 1941 – 2 September 2012) was a British guitarist, vocalist and songwriter in the jazz and blues vein. He was born in London, England.

== Biography ==
Marshall came from a family of musicians; his grandfather was a music teacher and taught guitar, banjo and harp, and his father played the banjo, guitar and piano. His family had weekly musical evenings, in which the boy took part at a very early age. As a teenager he played the guitar in various bands in North London pubs.

In the mid-sixties, Marshall left England to go to Paris. There, he met the American drummer Alvin Sykes, a nephew of Cab Calloway, with whose band he toured the whole of Europe for some years. After that he made numerous appearances for the American Special Services (Entertainment) as the guitarist accompanying many American artists engaged to entertain the US troops. Among these were Big Mama Thornton, Dinah Washington, Ben E. King and Brook Benton.

In 1972 he settled down for some years in Amsterdam, taking part in the very active jazz scene there. Here, among others, he played with Rosa King, Hans Dulfer, Slide Hampton, Chet Baker, and Dave Kamien. During this time, he appeared repeatedly, doing the guitar accompaniment for American artists touring Europe – among others, for Ray Charles, Aretha Franklin, and Gene “Mighty Flea” Conners.

In 1979 he reached the attention of the German television public as the regular guitarist in the WDR series “Let's Swing” - directed by Dave Kamien. In 1981, Marshall was one of the founding members of the “Olympic Rock & Blues Circus” - together with Chris Farlowe, Pete York, Colin Hodgkinson, and Brian Auger, who was replaced shortly afterwards by Jon Lord. In 1982, together with the keyboarder Chris Lazenby, he founded the band “Step'In Out”. Their debut album “Another Happy Customer” was praised highly by the press and achieved respectable sales figures. In 2010, it was re-issued, and has become very popular in Japan.

In the mid-eighties he founded the “John Marshall Band”, also known as “JMB”, which appeared at the North Sea Jazz Festival, and was continued, with various line-ups, as the “John C. Marshall Band”. From 1993 to 1995, he was a featured soloist in the RTL Big Band, for which he also wrote arrangements, and with which he recorded the album “R&B Party”. In this period, too, he worked in the Dutch Acid-Jazz band “Advanced Warning”, together with the keyboarder Herbert Noord, the sax player Rinus Groeneveld, and the Focus drummer Pierre van der Linden.

From until his death he was active in various jazz and blues projects, as with Pia Fridhill, A. G. Weinberger, “Men At Jazz”, and as the musical director of the “Big Band Friends” from Düsseldorf. Marshall lived in Düsseldorf, and was active in various jazz formations.

== Discography ==
=== As Leader ===
- Step'In Out – Another Happy Customer (1983/2010)
- John Marshall Band – Compared to What! (1988)
- John Marshall Band – Handmade (1990)
- Black Jack – with Bobby „Bro“ Gaynair (1992)
- John Marshall Band – Same Old Story (1993)
- John C. Marshall & RTL Big Band – R&B Party (1994)
- The Chant – with Steve Galloway, Ron Wilson, Doug Sides, Bert Thompson (1995)
- John C. Marshall Band & Pia Fridhill – Blues Business (2000)
- John C. Marshall Band – Live at the CPM (2009)

=== As Sideman ===
- Let’s Swing – Jazz zum Mitmachen (1979)
- Olympic Rock & Blues Circus (1981)
- Gene Mighty Flea Conners – Sanctified (1981)
- Rolf Lebeda – Boogie (1982)
- Gene Mighty Flea Conners Sings and Plays R&B (1984)
- Advanced Warning – Watch Out for the Jazz Police (1993)
- Advanced Warning – Cut the Crap (1995)
- Men at Jazz – Laid Back (2001)
