= Well Oh Well =

Single by Tiny Bradshaw
- Released: 1950
- Label: King
- Songwriters: Lois Mann, Tiny Bradshaw, Henry Bernard

"Well Oh Well" is a song written by Lois Mann, Tiny Bradshaw, and Henry Bernard. The song was based on Bing Crosby's 1944 number one hit, "San Fernando Valley". It was performed by Bradshaw and released on the King label (catalog no. 4357-AA). It debuted on Billboard magazine's R&B chart on May 20, 1950, peaked at No. 2 (best seller and jukebox), and remained on the chart for 21 weeks. It was ranked No. 7 on Billboard's year-end list of the best-selling R&B records of 1950 (No. 11 based on jukebox plays). Singer pianist Moon Mullican covered the song, also on the King label, in 1950.

== See also ==
- Billboard Top R&B Records of 1950
