= Confessin' the Blues =

Studio album by Esther Phillips
- Released: 1975
- Recorded: 1966, 1970
- Label: Atlantic
- Producer: Nesuhi Ertegun, King Curtis

Esther Phillips chronology
What a Diff'rence a Day Makes (1975)	Confessin' the Blues (1975)	For All We Know (1976)

Confessin' the Blues is an album by the American musician Esther Phillips. It was released in 1975, with an Atlantic Jazzlore reissue in 1987.

The album peaked at No. 170 on the Billboard 200.

== Production ==
The album was produced by Nesuhi Ertegun and King Curtis. It is made up of two recording sessions. The first side contains big band numbers conducted by Onzy Matthews. The second side was recorded with a quartet of jazz musicians at the Pied Piper Club, in Los Angeles. The songs on the first side were recorded in 1966; the songs on side two in 1970. Donald Bailey played drums on some of the tracks.

== Critical reception ==
Professional ratings
Review scores
Source	Rating
AllMusic	4/5 stars
Robert Christgau	A−
The Encyclopedia of Popular Music	3/5 stars
MusicHound R&B: The Essential Album Guide	3.5/5 stars
The Rolling Stone Album Guide	4/5 stars

Robert Christgau opined that "consistent material (lots of twelve-bar) and the complete absence of violins make these sessions ... preferable to the run of her Kudu albums."

The Washington Informer called the first side "Phillips at her best, with the kind intelligently conceived support that her major talent deserved." The Ottawa Citizen wrote that "there's some gutsy, wailing playing here and great arrangements by Onzy Matthews." The Omaha World-Herald determined that "the whining sound of her voice could become somewhat irritating, but she had a way with soulful songs."

AllMusic called the closing medley "the highlight of the set, showing Phillips in a bluesy setting." The Rolling Stone Album Guide wrote that the performances are "amusing, bittersweet and heart-rending." The Houston Chronicle listed the album as one of the 75 essential Texas blues albums.

== Track listing ==
No.	Title	Length
1.	"I'm Gettin' 'Long Alright"
2.	"I Wonder"
3.	"Confessin' the Blues"
4.	"Romance in the Dark"
5.	"C.C. Rider"
6.	"Cherry Red"
7.	"In the Evenin'"
8.	"I Love Paris"
9.	"It Could Happen to You"
10.	"Bye Bye Blackbird"
11.	"Blow Top Blues / Jelly Jelly Blues / Long John Blues"
