= For You My Love =

"For You My Love" is a 1949 song written by Paul Gayten. The song was recorded the same year by Larry Darnell, who had his most successful release with his version of the song. "For You My Love" went to number one on the U.S. R&B chart and was Larry Darnell's debut release.

== Cover Versions ==
- In 1950, Nellie Lutcher and Nat King Cole released their version of the song, where it reached number eight on the R&B chart.
