= Tiny Bradshaw =

American jazz and R&B drummer and bandleader (1907–1958)

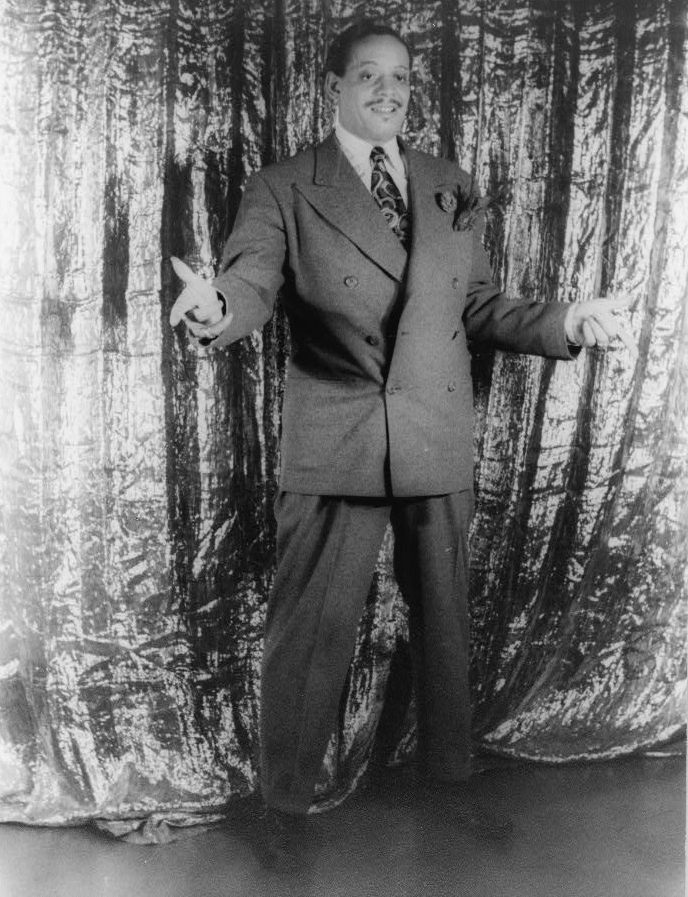
- Bradshaw in 1942

Background information
- Born: Myron Carlton Bradshaw; September 23, 1907; Youngstown, Ohio, U.S.
- Died: November 26, 1958 (aged 51) Cincinnati, Ohio, U.S.
- Genres: Jazz; R&B
- Occupations: Musician; bandleader; composer
- Instruments: Vocals; piano; drums
- Years active: 1933–1958
- Labels: Decca; Regis; Manor; Savoy; King

Myron Carlton "Tiny" Bradshaw (September 23, 1907 – November 26, 1958) was an American jazz and rhythm and blues bandleader, composer, singer, pianist, and drummer. His biggest hit was "Well Oh Well" in 1950, and the following year he recorded "The Train Kept A-Rollin'", a song that was pivotal to the development of rock and roll. Bradshaw co-wrote and sang on both records.

== Early years ==
Myron Carlton Bradshaw was born in Youngstown, Ohio, the son of Cicero P. Bradshaw and his wife, Lillian Boggess. Bradshaw graduated from high school in Youngstown. After graduating from Wilberforce University with a degree in psychology, Bradshaw turned to music for a living. In Ohio, he sang and played drums with Horace Henderson's campus-oriented Collegians. Then, in 1932, Bradshaw relocated to New York City, where he drummed for Marion Hardy's Alabamians, the Charleston Bearcats (later the Savoy Bearcats), and the Mills Blue Rhythm Band, and sang for Luis Russell.

== Bandleader ==
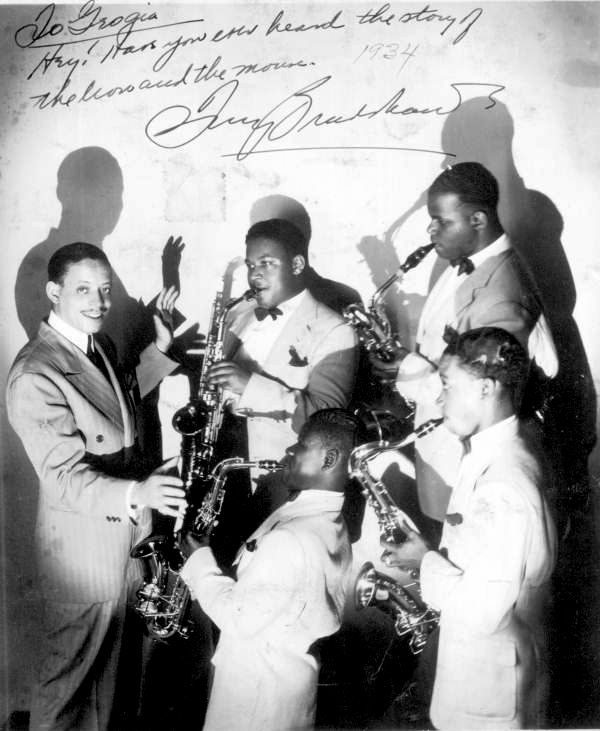
Bradshaw (left) with saxophonists from his band, 1934

In 1934, Bradshaw formed his own swing orchestra, which recorded eight sides in two separate sessions for Decca Records that year in New York City. The band's next recording date was in 1944 for Manor Records, at which point its music was closer to rhythm and blues. In 1947, Bradshaw recorded for Savoy Records under the auspices of label producer Teddy Reig.

The band recorded extensively for the rhythm and blues market with King Records, between late 1949 and early 1955, and had five hits on the Billboard R&B chart. His most successful record at the time was "Well Oh Well", which reached number two on the R&B chart in 1950 and remained on the chart for 21 weeks. Two follow-ups, "I'm Going to Have Myself a Ball" (no. 5, 1950) and "Walkin' The Chalk Line" (no. 10, 1951) also made the chart, before a break of almost two years.

What is now Bradshaw's best known recording was "The Train Kept A-Rollin'" (1951) – not a chart hit at the time – which passed from rhythm and blues history into rock's legacy. The song was recorded by Johnny Burnette & The Rock and Roll Trio in 1956 and by The Yardbirds with Jeff Beck in 1965. It was covered again by Aerosmith in 1974 and by Motörhead in 1977. Furthermore, Jimmy Page reported in an interview that the first song played, at the very first rehearsal of what would become the English rock band Led Zeppelin, was "The Train Kept A-Rollin'".

Bradshaw returned to the R&B chart in 1953 with "Soft" (no. 3), an instrumental later recorded by Bill Doggett, and "Heavy Juice" (no. 9). Both of these 1953 hits featured Red Prysock on tenor saxophone.

Bradshaw's later career was hampered by severe health problems, including two strokes, the first of which in 1954, that left him partially paralyzed. He made a return to touring in 1958. His last session that year resulted in two recordings, "Short Shorts" and "Bushes" (King 5114), which proved an unsuccessful attempt to reach out to the emerging teenage record market.

Weakened by the successive strokes as well as the rigors of his profession, Bradshaw died in his adopted hometown of Cincinnati from another stroke in 1958. He was 51 years old.

== Legacy ==
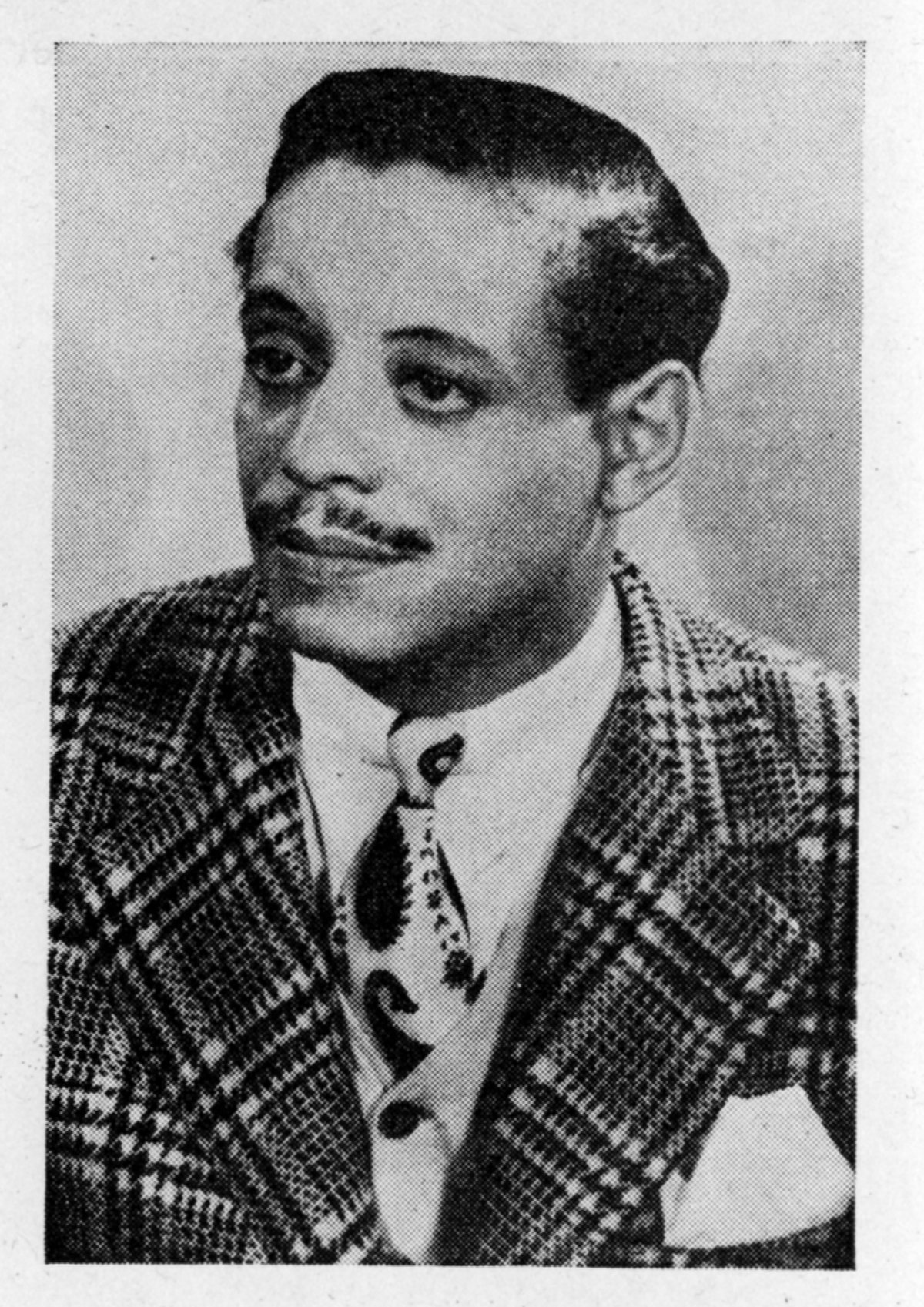
Bradshaw in 1936

Bradshaw is remembered for a string of rhythm and blues hits. As a bandleader, he was an invaluable mentor to important musicians and arrangers including Sil Austin, Happy Caldwell, Shad Collins, Wild Bill Davis, Talib Dawud, Gil Fuller, Gigi Gryce, Big Nick Nicholas, Russell Procope, Red Prysock, Curley Russell, Calvin "Eagle Eye" Shields, Sonny Stitt, Noble "Thin Man" Watts, and Shadow Wilson.

== Discography ==
=== Singles ===
Decca Records

- 194 "The Darktown Strutter's Ball" / "The Sheik of Araby" (1934)
- 236 "Ol' Man River" / "I'm a Ding Dong Daddy" (1934)
- 317 "Mister, Will You Serenade" / "She'll Be Coming 'Round the Mountain" (1934)
- 456 "Shout, Sister, Shout" / "I Ain't Got Nobody" (1934)

Regis Records

- 1010 "Straighten Up and Fly Right" / "Bradshaw Bounce" (1944)
- 1010 "After You've Gone" / "Salt Lake City Bounce" (1944)
- 1011 "After You've Gone" / "Salt Lake City Bounce" [reissued with the correct number] (1944)

Manor Records

- 1052 "Butterfly" / "Schoolday Blues" (a.k.a. "P.S. 81 Blues") (1945)
- 1082 "After You've Gone" / "Salt City Bounce" [reissue of Regis 1011] (1945)
- 1147 "V-2" / "I Found Out Too Late" (1946)
- 1149 "Salt Lake City Bounce" / "After You've Gone" [reissued with the correct title] (1946)
- 1181 "Bride and Groom Boogie" / "Six Shooter Junction" (1946)

Savoy Records

- 650 "These Things Are Love" / "I've Been Around" (1947)
- 655 "Take the Hands off the Clock" / "If I Had a Million Dollars" (1947)

King Records

- 4337 "Teardrops" / "Gravy Train" (1949)
- 4357 "Well Oh Well" / "I Hate You" (1950)
- 4376 "Boodie Green" / "After You're Gone" (1950)
- 4397 "I'm Going to Have Myself a Ball" / "Butterfly" (1950)
- 4417 "Breaking up the House" / "If You Don't Love Me, Tell Me So" (1950)
- 4427 "Walk That Mess" / "One, Two, Three, Kick Blues" (1950)
- 4447 "Two Dry Bones on the Pantry Shelf" / "Brad's Blues" (1951)
- 4457 "Bradshaw Boogie" / "Walkin' the Chalk Line" (1951)
- 4467 "I'm a Hi-Ballin' Daddy" / "You Came By" (1951)
- 4487 "T-99" / "Long Time Baby" (1951)
- 4497 "The Train Kept A-Rollin'" / "Knockin' Blues" (1951)
- 4537 "Mailman's Sack" / "Newspaper Boy Blues" (1952)
- 4547 "Lay It on the Line" / "Rippin' and Runnin'" (1952)
- 4577 "Soft" / "Strange" (1952)
- 4621 "Heavy Juice" / "The Blues Came Pouring Down" (1953)
- 4647 "Free for All" / "Off and On" (1953)
- 4664 "Later" / "South of the Orient" (1953)
- 4687 "Ping Pong" / "Powder Puff" (1953)
- 4713 "Don't Worry 'Bout Me" / "Overflow" (1954)
- 4727 "The Gypsy" / "Spider Web" (1954)
- 4747 "Stack of Dollars" / "Cat Fruit" (1954)
- 4757 "Light" / "Choice" (1954)
- 4777 "Cat Nap" / "Stomping Room Only" (1955)
- 4787 "Pompton Turnpike" / "Come On" (1955)
- 5114 "Short Shorts" / "Bushes" (1958)

=== Compilation albums ===
- Breakin' up the House, Charly R&B #CRB-1092 [LP] (1985); Charly R&B #CD-43 (1987)
- I'm a Hi-Ballin' Daddy, Jukebox Lil #JB-621 [LP] (1989)
- Walk That Mess! The Best of the King Years, Westside #WESA-824 (1998)
- The EP Collection...Plus, See for Miles #SEECD-703 (1999)
- The Chronological Tiny Bradshaw 1934–1947, Classics (Blues & Rhythm Series) #5011 (2002)
- The Chronological Tiny Bradshaw 1949–1951, Classics (Blues & Rhythm Series) #5031 (2002)
- Breaking up the House, Proper Pairs #PVCD-101 (2002)
- Well Oh Well: The Very Best of Tiny Bradshaw, Collectables #COL-2880 (2004)
- Heavy Juice: The King Recordings 1950–55, Rev-Ola #CRBAND-3 (2006)
- The Jumpin' Beat for The Hip Kids 1949–1955, Jasmine #JASMCD-3252 (2023)
