= Cupid's Boogie =

"Cupid's Boogie" is a 1950 song by Little Esther backed by bandleader, and writer of the song, Johnny Otis for Savoy Records which went to #1 on the US R&B Chart.
