= Blue Light Boogie (song) =

Single by Louis Jordan and his Tympany Five
- Released: 1950
- Genre: Jump blues
- Length: 5:30
- Label: Decca
- Songwriter(s): Jessie Mae Robinson, Louis Jordan

"Blue Light Boogie" is a song written by Jessie Mae Robinson and Louis Jordan. It was performed by Louis Jordan and his Tympany Five, recorded in June 1950, and released on the Decca label (catalog no. 27114). On the original 78 record, the song was divided into two parts with part 1 on the "A" side and part 2 on the "B" side.

The song peaked at No. 4 on Billboard's R&B chart. It was ranked No. 8 on Billboard's year-end list of the top-selling R&B records of 1950 and No. 9 based on juke box plays.

== See also ==
- Billboard Top R&B Records of 1950
