= Hard Luck Blues =

1950 song by Roy Brown and His Mighty-Mighty Men

"Hard Luck Blues" is a 1950 song by Roy Brown and His Mighty-Mighty Men. The single, backed by the Griffin Brothers Orchestra, was the most successful of Brown's career, reaching the number-one spot on the US Billboard R&B chart. "Hard Luck Blues" reflected the ritual expression of inward griefs. The song was written by Brown and AllMusic's correspondent, Bruce Eder, noted that the track was "almost unbearably tortured".
