= Double Crossing Blues =

"Double Crossing Blues" is a 1950 song by Johnny Otis Quintette, the Robins, and Little Esther. It was released as a 78-rpm single (731-A) by Savoy Records in 1950. The single went to number one on the US Billboard R&B chart.

== Song background ==
"Double Crossing Blues" was the debut single for Little Esther, who was then fourteen years old, making her the youngest female singer to have a number-one single on the R&B chart. The original Savoy record label showed Otis as the writer, but the actual composer, Jessie Mae Robinson, sued, won an out-of-court settlement in March 1950, and copyrighted the song under her name.
