= Bardu Ali =

American jazz guitarist and R&B singer

- Born: September 23, 1906; U.S.
- Died: October 29, 1981 (aged 75) Inglewood, California
- Genres: Jazz, blues
- Occupations: Singer, promoter
- Instruments: Guitar, vocals

Bardu (born Bahadour) Ali (September 23, 1906 – October 29, 1981) was an American jazz and R&B singer, guitarist, and promoter.

== Biography ==
It has been reported that Ali was born September 23, 1910, or 1906, in Mississippi. His sister and older brothers born in New Orleans, Louisiana, to Ella Blackman, a new Orleans native, and Moksad Ali, an immigrant from Hooghly, in the Indian state of Bengal. There were several children born to this union. A profile of Ali in the Baltimore Afro-American in 1926 described Ali as "the son of Makrad Ali, a Turkish silk importer who came to America many years ago... [who married] Elizabeth Ali, a Creole girl of [New Orleans]." While both of these characterizations are incorrect, Ali and his family carried many identities and lived in a multitude of U.S. cities. Two of the older sons moved to Galveston, Texas, but Ella moved to the Bronx, New York, with her other children and her sister Fanny. He got involved with black cinema in the late 1920s and 1930s.

He moved to New York City in the 1920s and became leader of the Napoleon Zyas band. He was master of ceremonies for this band and for the bands of Leroy Tibbs and Chick Webb. He is credited with persuading Webb to hire singer Ella Fitzgerald. He went on tour in England with Lew Leslie's Blackbirds revue. Returning to the US, he replaced Webb in 1935 as bandleader after Webb died. In 1940, he moved to California, where he became a business partner of Johnny Otis, performed as a singer in Otis's band, and opened The Barrelhouse club with him in 1947. He played an important role in the early career of Charles Brown and was Redd Foxx's business manager.

== Relative ==
- Rozonda Thomas
