= Pink Champagne (Joe Liggins song) =

Song
- Released: 1950

"Pink Champagne" is a 1950 single by Joe Liggins and His Honeydrippers. The song might have been composed by gospel singer and songwriter Doris Akers.

The single, released on Specialty #355 and backed with "Sentimental Love", was Liggins' second number one on the U.S. R&B chart and third entry on the national charts, where "Pink Champagne" peaked at number 30.
