= Esther Phillips =

American singer (1935–1984)

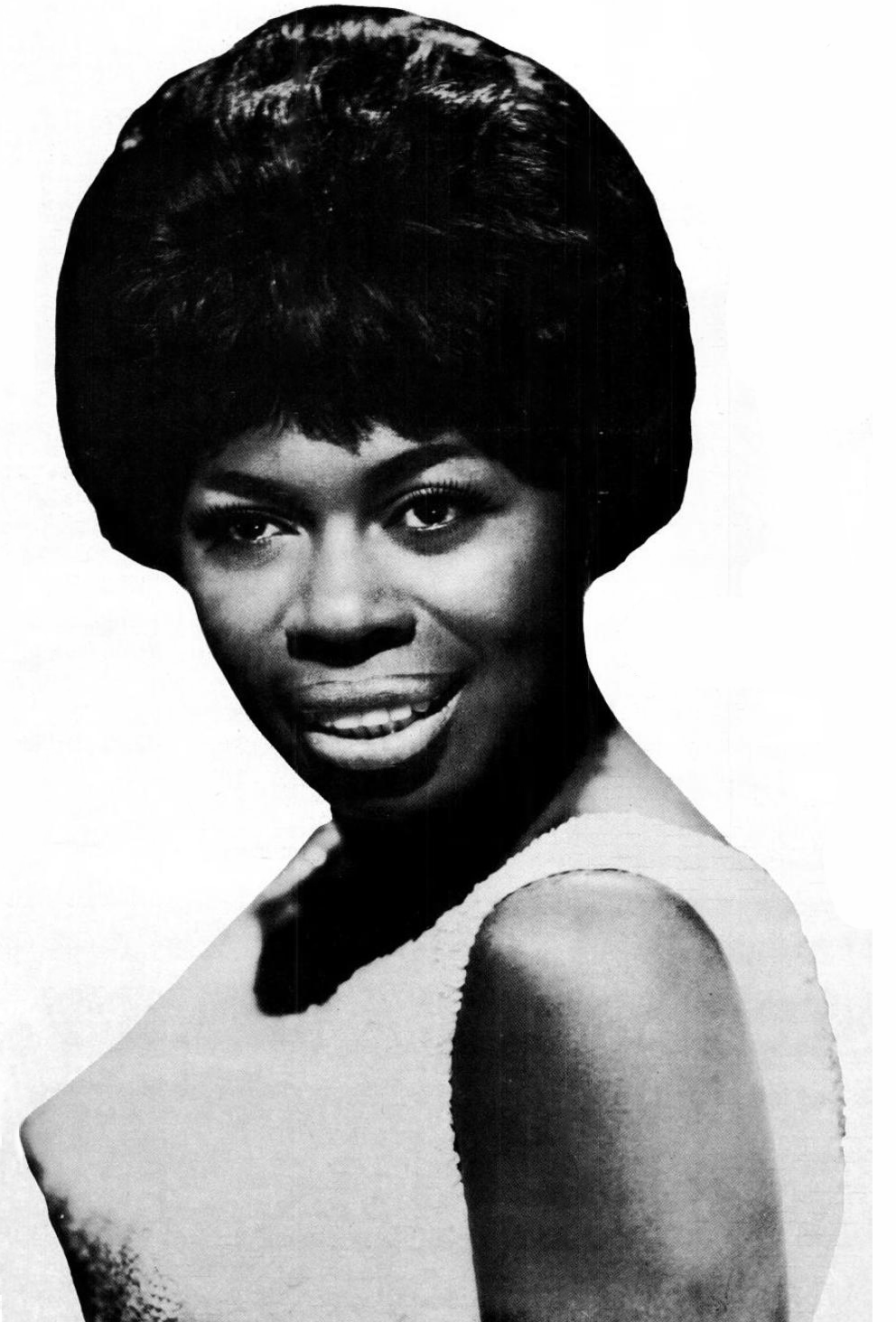
- Phillips in 1966

Background information
- Also known as: Little Esther Phillips
- Born: Esther Mae Jones; December 23, 1935; Galveston, Texas, US
- Died: August 7, 1984 (aged 48) Carson, California, US
- Genres: R&B, blues, pop, country, jazz, soul
- Occupation: Vocalist
- Years active: 1949–1984
- Labels: Atlantic, Kudu, Mercury, Lenox

Esther Phillips (December 23, 1935 – August 7, 1984), born Esther Mae Jones, was an American singer, best known for her R&B vocals. She rose to prominence in 1950, scoring several major R&B hits including "Double Crossing Blues" and "Mistrustin' Blues" under the moniker "Little Esther." In the 1960s, she achieved chart success with the country song "Release Me" and recorded in the pop, jazz, blues and soul genres. Phillips received four Grammy nominations, including for her album From a Whisper to a Scream in 1973, as well as for the album that featured her disco recording of "What a Diff'rence a Day Makes," which was a major hit in 1975. She died from liver and kidney failure due to long-term drug abuse in 1984.

== Biography ==
=== Early life ===
Esther Phillips was born Esther Mae Jones in Galveston, Texas, the daughter of Arthur Jones and Lucille (née) Washington. Her parents divorced during her adolescence, and she divided her time between her father, in Houston, and her mother, in the Watts section of Los Angeles. She was brought up singing in church and was reluctant to enter a talent contest at a local blues club, but her sister insisted. A mature singer at the age of 14, she won the amateur talent contest in 1949 at the Barrelhouse Club, owned by Johnny Otis. Otis was so impressed that he recorded her for Modern Records and added her to his traveling revue, the California Rhythm and Blues Caravan, billed as Little Esther. She later took the surname Phillips as her stage name, reportedly inspired by a sign at a gas station.

=== Early career ===
Her first hit record was "Double Crossing Blues", with the Johnny Otis Quintette and the Robins (a vocal group), released in 1950 by Savoy Records, which reached number 1 on the Billboard R&B chart. She made several hit records for Savoy with the Johnny Otis Orchestra, including "Mistrusting Blues" (a duet with Mel Walker) and "Cupid's Boogie", both of which also went to number 1 that year. Four more of her records made the Top 10 in the same year: "Misery" (number 9), "Deceivin' Blues" (number 4), "Wedding Boogie" (number 6), and "Far Away Blues (Xmas Blues)" (number 6). Few female artists performing in any genre had such success in their debut year.

Phillips left Otis and the Savoy label at the end of 1950 and signed with Federal Records. But just as quickly as the hits had started, they stopped. She recorded more than thirty sides for Federal, but only one, "Ring-a-Ding-Doo", made the charts, reaching number 8 in 1952. Not working with Otis was part of her problem; the other part was her deepening dependence on heroin, to which she was addicted by the middle of the decade.

In 1954, she returned to Houston to live with her father and recuperate. Short on money, she worked in small nightclubs around the South, punctuated by periodic hospital stays in Lexington, Kentucky, to treat her addiction. In 1962, Kenny Rogers discovered her singing at a Houston club and helped her get a contract with Lenox Records, owned by his brother Lelan.

=== Comeback ===
Phillips eventually recovered enough to launch a comeback in 1962. Now billed as Esther Phillips instead of Little Esther, she recorded a country tune, "Release Me", with the producer Bob Gans. This went to number 1 on the R&B chart and number 8 on the pop chart. After several other minor R&B hits for Lenox, she was signed by Atlantic Records. Her cover of the Beatles' song "And I Love Him" nearly made the R&B Top 20 in 1965. The Beatles flew her to the UK for her first overseas performances. In July 2018, Paul McCartney recalled "the earliest [Beatles cover] that really caught my ear was by Esther Phillips ... 'And I Love Him' which is really great. I love it."

She had other hits in the 1960s for Atlantic, such as the Jimmy Radcliffe song "Try Me", which featured a saxophone part by King Curtis (and is often mistakenly credited as the James Brown song of the same title), but she had no more chart-toppers. Her heroin dependence worsened, and she checked into a rehabilitation facility. There she met the singer Sam Fletcher. While undergoing treatment, she recorded some sides for Roulette in 1969, mostly produced by Lelan Rogers. On her release, she returned to Los Angeles and re-signed with Atlantic. Her friendship with Fletcher resulted in a performance engagement at Freddie Jett's Pied Piper club in late 1969, which produced the album Burnin'. She performed with the Johnny Otis Show at the Monterey Jazz Festival in 1970.

=== The 1970s and 1980s ===
"With her lubricious, naturally sardonic high vibrato, this modern blues singer is well equipped to carry Dinah Washington's torch, and a club date with the likes of Chuck Rainey and Cornell Dupree is the perfect place for her to shine her light—even the horn overdubs sound hot."

— Review of Burnin' in Christgau's Record Guide: Rock Albums of the Seventies (1981)

One of her biggest post-1950s triumphs was her first album for the Kudu label, From a Whisper to a Scream, in 1972. The lead track, "Home Is Where the Hatred Is", an account of drug use written by Gil Scott-Heron, was nominated for a Grammy Award. Phillips lost to Aretha Franklin, but Franklin presented the trophy to her, saying she should have won it instead.

In 1975, she released a disco-style update of Dinah Washington's "What a Diff'rence a Day Makes", her biggest hit single since "Release Me". It reached the Top 20 in the United States and the Top 10 in the UK Singles Chart. On November 8, 1975, she performed the song on an episode of NBC's Saturday Night (later called Saturday Night Live) hosted by Candice Bergen. The accompanying album of the same name became her biggest seller yet, with arranger Joe Beck on guitar, Michael Brecker on tenor sax, David Sanborn on alto sax, Randy Brecker on trumpet, Steve Khan on guitar and Don Grolnick on keyboards.

She continued to record and perform throughout the 1970s and early 1980s, completing seven albums for Kudu/CTI and four for Mercury Records, which signed her in 1977. Her first album for Mercury, You've Come a Long Way, Baby, was released that year; according to Village Voice critic Robert Christgau, "using Kudu producer Pee Wee Ellis and the basic Kudu formula—mixing blues and standards and rock with MOR and disco crossovers—she comes up with her most consistent album of the '70s."

In 1983, she charted for the final time with "Turn Me Out", which reached number 85 on the R&B chart. She completed recording her final album, A Way To Say Goodbye, a few months before her death; it was released by the Muse jazz label in 1986.

=== Death ===
Phillips died at UCLA Medical Center in Carson, California, in 1984, at the age of 48, from liver and kidney failure due to long-term drug abuse. Her funeral services were conducted by Johnny Otis.

Originally buried in an unmarked pauper's grave at Lincoln Memorial Park in Compton, she was reinterred in 1985 in the Morning Light section at Forest Lawn Memorial Park, Hollywood Hills, in Los Angeles. A bronze marker recognizes her career achievements and quotes a Bible passage: "In My Father's House Are Many Mansions" (John 14:2).

== Rock and Roll Hall of Fame ==
Phillips was twice nominated for the Rock and Roll Hall of Fame, in 1986 and 1987, but has not yet been inducted.

== Blues Hall of Fame ==
In 2023 Phillips was inducted in the Blues Hall of Fame.

== Grammy nominations ==
Esther Phillips Grammy Award History
Year	Category	Title	Genre	Label	Result
1970	Best Rhythm & Blues Vocal Performance – Female	"Set Me Free"	R&B	Atlantic	Nominee
1972	Best Rhythm & Blues Vocal Performance – Female	From a Whisper to a Scream	R&B	Kudu/CTI	Nominee
1973	Best Rhythm & Blues Vocal Performance – Female	Alone Again (Naturally)	R&B	Kudu/CTI	Nominee
1975	Best Rhythm & Blues Vocal Performance – Female	What a Diff'rence a Day Makes	R&B	Kudu/CTI	Nominee

== Discography ==
=== Albums ===
Year	Title	Label	US	US Jazz	US R&B	AUS
1963	Release Me	Lenox	46	—	—	—
1965	And I Love Him!	Atlantic	—	—	—	—
1966	Esther Phillips Sings	Atlantic	—	—	—	—
1966	The Country Side of Esther	Atlantic	—	—	—	—
1970	Live at Freddie Jett's Pied Piper	Atlantic	—	—	—	—
1970	Burnin' (Live)	Atlantic	115	12	7	—
1972	From a Whisper to a Scream	Kudu/CTI	137	—	16	—
1972	Alone Again, Naturally	Kudu/CTI	177	15	26	—
1974	Black-Eyed Blues	Kudu/CTI	205	15	17	—
1975	Performance	Kudu/CTI	—	27	46	—
1975	Esther Phillips and Joe Beck	Kudu/CTI	—	3	—	—
1975	What a Diff'rence a Day Makes	Kudu/CTI	32	—	13	99
1976*	Capricorn Princess	Kudu/CTI	150	23	40	—
1976*	Confessin' the Blues*	Atlantic* (1966, 1970)	170	26	35	—
1976*	For All We Know	Kudu/CTI	—	32	33	—
1977	You've Come a Long Way, Baby	Mercury	—	—	—	—
1978	All About Esther	Mercury	—	—	—	—
1979	Here's Esther, Are You Ready	Mercury	—	47	—	—
1981	Good Black Is Hard to Crack	Mercury	—	—	—	—
1986	A Way to Say Goodbye	Muse (Compilation).	—	—	—	—

=== Singles ===
Year	Single	Chart positions				
Year	Single	US	US R&B	US AC	AUS	UK
1950	"Double Crossing Blues"*	—	1	—	—	—
1950	"Mistrusting Blues"*	—	1	—	—	—
1950	"Misery"*	—	9	—	—	—
1950	"Cupid's Boogie"*	—	1	—	—	—
1950	"Deceivin' Blues"*	—	4	—	—	—
1950	"Wedding Boogie"*	—	6	—	—	—
1950	"Far Away Blues (Xmas Blues)"*	—	6	—	—	—
1952	"Ring-a-Ding-Doo"	—	8	—	—	—
1962	"Release Me"	8	1	—	—	—
1963	"I Really Don't Want to Know"	61	—	—	—	—
1963	"Am I That Easy to Forget"	112	—	—	—	—
1963	"You Never Miss Your Water (Til the Well Runs Dry)"**	73	—	—	—	—
1963	"If You Want It (I've Got It)"**	129	—	—	—	—
1964	"Hello Walls"	—	36	—	—	—
1965	"And I Love Him"	54	11	14	—	—
1965	"Moonglow and Theme from Picnic"	115	—	28	—	—
1965	"Let Me Know When It's Over"	129	—	—	—	—
1966	"When a Woman Loves a Man"	73	26	—	—	—
1969	"Too Late to Worry, Too Blue to Cry"	121	35	—	—	—
1970	"Set Me Free"	118	39	—	—	—
1972	"Home Is Where the Hatred Is"	122	40	—	—	—
1972	"Baby, I'm for Real"	—	38	—	—	—
1972	"I've Never Found a Man (To Love Me Like You Do)"	106	17	—	—	—
1975	"What a Diff'rence a Day Makes"***	20	10	29	38	6
1976	"For All We Know"	—	98	—	—	—
1983	"Turn Me Out"	—	85	—	—	—

* With the Johnny Otis Orchestra
** With Big Al Downing
*** "What a Diff'rence a Day Makes" also reached number 2 on the US Dance chart. Another two-sided single, "Magic's In the Air" / "Boy I Really Tied One On", peaked at number 5 on the same chart in 1976.

==== Complete singles for Federal Records, 1951–1953 ====
All released on 45- and 78-rpm records

1951

Federal 12016, "The Deacon Moves In" (with the Dominoes) / "Other Lips, Other Arms"
Federal 12023, "I'm a Bad, Bad Girl" / "Don't Make a Fool Out of Me"
Federal 12036, "Lookin' for a Man to Satisfy My Soul" / "Heart to Heart" (with The Dominoes)
Federal 12042, "Cryin' and Singin' the Blues" / "Tell Him That I Need Him"

1952

Federal 12055, "Ring-a-Ding-Doo" (with Bobby Nunn) / "The Cryin' Blues"
Federal 12063, "Summertime" / "The Storm"
Federal 12065, "Better Beware" / "I'll Be There"
Federal 12078, "Aged and Mellow" / "Bring My Lovin' Back to Me"
Federal 12090, "Ramblin' Blues" / "Somebody New"
Federal 12100, "Mainliner" (with 4 Jacks) / "Saturday Night Daddy" (with Bobby Nunn)

1953

Federal 12108, "Last Laugh Blues" (with Little Willie Littlefield) / "Flesh, Blood and Bones"
Federal 12115, "Turn The Lamp Down Low" (with Little Willie Littlefield) / "Hollerin' and Screamin'"
Federal 12122, "You Took My Love Too Fast" (with Bobby Nunn) / "Street Lights"
Federal 12126, "Hound Dog" / "Sweet Lips"
Federal 12142, "Cherry Wine" / "Love Oh Love"

Taken from the original logbooks of the defunct Federal Records, which I copied decades ago.

== Filmography ==
Television

- 1965: The Music of Lennon & McCartney, musical guest
- 1970: The Barbara McNair Show, musical guest
- 1970: The Tonight Show Starring Johnny Carson, musical guest
- 1975: Saturday Night Live, musical guest
- 1975: Soul Train, musical guest
