= Larry Darnell =

- Birth name: Leo Edward Donald, Jr.
- Born: December 17, 1928; Columbus, Ohio, U.S
- Died: July 3, 1983 (aged 54); Columbus, Ohio, U.S.
- Genres: R&B, rock and roll
- Years active: 1949-1969

Larry Darnell (born Leo Edward Donald, Jr.; December 17, 1928, Columbus, Ohio – July 3, 1983, Columbus) was a successful American singer, who was instrumental in the formation of the New Orleans style of R&B in the late 1940s and early 1950s.

== Biography ==
As an eleven-year-old Darnell achieved local fame as a gospel singer, and left home at 15 years of age to work as a dancer with a burlesque road show, the Brownskin Models. In New Orleans he gained steady employment as a singer at the Dew Drop Inn. In 1949, he was signed up by Fred Mendelsohn for the Regal label in New Jersey. His first two recordings, "I'll Get Along Somehow" and "For You My Love", both hit the R&B charts in November 1949, with "For You My Love", written by Paul Gayten, staying at the number 1 spot for eight weeks.

The follow-ups "I Love My Baby" and Louis Prima's "Oh Babe!" were also hits, and Darnell's powerful and passionate voice contributed to the development of a trend in popular music soon marketed nationwide as rock and roll. Darnell was the top selling R & B artist of 1950. However, after Regal collapsed in 1951, his records became less successful. By now known as "Mr. Heart & Soul", he appeared in the 1955 movie Harlem Rock & Roll Revue, and spent the rest of the decade recording for various labels.

In 1969, he made his final recordings, for the Instant label in New Orleans. Receding from professional activity, he continued to sing in church and at charitable events. In April 1979, while en route to sing at a funeral in Akron, Ohio, he was mugged by a gang, and received severe injuries. The doctors operating on him to save his life discovered he had lung cancer, from which he died in 1983.
