= Mel Walker (musician) =

American singer

Malvin Lightsy (November 3, 1928 – April 23, 1964), known professionally as Mel Walker, was an American R&B singer best known for his recordings in the early 1950s as lead male singer with the Johnny Otis Orchestra.

Born in Bloomburg, Texas, he grew up in Los Angeles and attended Jefferson High School with Floyd Dixon. In 1949, he was discovered by Johnny Otis and joined his band, singing with Otis until around 1953. On many recordings he featured in duets with Little Esther, and also recorded with The Robins.

Walker was credited as lead singer on many of Otis' earliest and biggest R&B hits, including "Mistrustin' Blues" and "Cupid Boogie", both of which reached No. 1 on the Billboard R&B chart in 1950, and "Rockin' Blues", an R&B No. 2 hit in 1951. He recorded Floyd Dixon's song "Call Operator 210", and had a No. 4 R&B chart hit in 1952.

Walker was jailed on narcotics charges in the early 1950s. His body was found in an alley in Los Angeles on April 23, 1964, after an apparent drug overdose.
