= Johnny Otis =

Greek-American musical entertainer (1921–2012)

Background information
- Born: Ioannis Alexandres Veliotes; December 28, 1921; Vallejo, California, U.S.
- Died: January 17, 2012 (aged 90) Los Angeles, California, U.S.
- Genres: Blues; R&B; rock and roll
- Instruments: Piano; vibraphone; drums; percussion; vocals
- Years active: 1940s–2000s
- Spouse: Phyllis Walker (m. 1941)

Johnny Otis (December 28, 1921 – January 17, 2012), born Ioannis Alexandres Veliotes, was an American singer, musician, composer, bandleader, record producer, talent scout, and preacher. He was a seminal influence on American R&B and rock and roll. He discovered numerous artists early in their careers who went on to become highly successful in their own right, including Little Esther Phillips, Etta James, Alan O'Day, Big Mama Thornton, Johnny Ace, Jackie Wilson, Little Willie John, Hank Ballard, The Robins, and Sugar Pie DeSanto, among many others. Otis has been called the "Godfather of Rhythm and Blues".

== Personal life ==
Otis was born in Vallejo, California, to Greek immigrant parents Alexander J. Veliotes, a Mare Island longshoreman and grocery store owner, and his wife, the former Irene Kiskakes, a painter. He had a younger sister, Dorothy, and a younger brother, Nicholas A. Veliotes, who became the U.S. Ambassador to Jordan (1978–1981) and Egypt (1984–1986). Johnny grew up in a predominantly black neighborhood in Berkeley, California, where his father owned a grocery store. Though the family spoke Greek and attended Greek Orthodox Church service, Johnny became known for his choice to live his professional and personal life as a member of the African-American community. He wrote, "As a kid I decided that if our society dictated that one had to be black or white, I would be black."

On May 2, 1941, when Otis was 19, he married Phyllis Walker, an 18-year-old woman of African American and Filipino descent from Oakland, whom he had known since childhood. Despite deep and enduring objections from his mother, the young couple left California and eloped to marry in Reno, Nevada, where interracial marriage was accepted at the time. They had four children: two sons, Shuggie Otis and Nicholas Otis—both of whom became musicians—and two daughters, Janice and Laura. Johnny and Phyllis also raised Lucky Otis, Shuggie's son with his first wife, Miss Mercy Fontenot of The GTOs.

== Music career ==
Otis began playing drums as a teenager, having bought a set by forging his father's signature on a credit slip. Soon after, he dropped out of Berkeley High School, in his junior year. He joined a local band, the West Oakland House Rockers, with his pianist friend "Count" Otis Matthews. By 1939, they were performing at many local functions, mostly in and around Oakland and Berkeley, and were popular among their peers.

In the early 1940s Otis played in swing orchestras, including Lloyd Hunter's Serenaders and Harlan Leonard's Rockets. He founded his own band in 1945; they had one of the most enduring hits of the big-band era, "Harlem Nocturne", a composition by Earle Hagen. His band included Wynonie Harris, Charles Brown, and Illinois Jacquet, among others. In 1947, he and Bardu Ali opened the Barrelhouse Club in the Watts district of Los Angeles. Otis reduced the size of his band and hired the singers Mel Walker, Little Esther (born Esther Mae Jones and later known as Esther Phillips) and the Robins (who later became the Coasters). He discovered the teenaged Esther Jones when she won a talent show at the Barrelhouse Club. With this band, he toured extensively in the United States as the California Rhythm and Blues Caravan, and had a string of rhythm-and-blues hits through 1950.

Otis and his Orchestra played at the third annual Cavalcade of Jazz concert held at Wrigley Field in Los Angeles produced by Leon Hefflin, Sr. on September 7, 1947. Woody Herman, The Valdez Orchestra, The Blenders, T-Bone Walker, Slim Gaillard, The Honeydrippers, Sarah Vaughn and the Three Blazers also performed that same day.

Otis discovered the tenor saxophonist Big Jay McNeely, who played on his up-tempo "Barrelhouse Stomp". He began recording Little Esther and Mel Walker for Savoy Records, based in Newark, New Jersey, in 1949, and also released a stream of hit records, including "Double Crossing Blues", "Mistrustin' Blues" and "Cupid's Boogie", all of which reached number 1 on the Billboard R&B chart. In 1950, Billboard selected Otis as the R&B Artist of the Year. He also began playing the vibraphone on many of his recordings.

In 1951, Otis released "Mambo Boogie", featuring congas, maracas, claves, and mambo saxophone guajeos in a blues progression, the first R&B mambo ever recorded. Otis moved to Mercury Records in 1951. He discovered the singer Etta James, who was then 13 years old, at one of his talent shows. He produced and co-wrote her first hit, "The Wallflower (Dance with Me, Henry)".

In 1952, while in Houston, Texas, Otis auditioned the singer Willie Mae "Big Mama" Thornton. He produced, co-wrote, and played drums on her 1952 recording of "Hound Dog" (the first recording of the song); he and his band also provided the backup "howling" vocals. The song was co-written by Jerry Leiber and Mike Stoller. Otis had a legal dispute with the songwriting duo over the credits after he learned that Leiber and Stoller had revised the contractual agreement before the singer Elvis Presley recorded a new version of the song, which quickly became a number 1 hit. Claiming Leiber and Stoller illegally had the original contract nullified and rewrote a new one stating that the two boys (who were both 17) were the only composers of the song, Otis sued. The judge decided the case in favor of the defendants, ruling that the first contract with Otis was null and void because they were minors when they signed it.

One of Otis's most famous compositions is the ballad "Every Beat of My Heart", first recorded by the Royals in 1952 for Federal Records. It was a hit for Gladys Knight and the Pips in 1961. Otis also produced and played the vibraphone on "Pledging My Love", by the singer Johnny Ace, which was number 1 on the Billboard R&B chart for 10 weeks. Another successful song for Otis was "So Fine", originally recorded by the Sheiks in 1955 for Federal and a hit for the Fiestas in 1959. As an artist and repertory man for King Records, Otis discovered numerous young prospects who later became successful, including Jackie Wilson, Hank Ballard, and Little Willie John.

Otis hosted a television show, The Johnny Otis Show, and became an influential disc jockey in Los Angeles, with a program on radio station KFOX in Long Beach in 1955.

In 1955, Otis started his own label, Ultra Records (he changed the name to Dig after releasing five singles). He continued to perform and appeared on TV shows in Los Angeles from 1957. On the strength of their success, he signed with Capitol Records. Featuring the singer Marie Adams and with his band, now known as the Johnny Otis Show, he made a comeback, at first in the British charts with "Ma! He's Making Eyes at Me" in 1957. In April 1958, he recorded his best-known song, "Willie and the Hand Jive", a clave-based vamp. It was a hit in the summer of 1958, peaking at number 9 on the U.S. Pop chart, and was Otis's only Top 10 single. The single reached number 1 on the Billboard R&B chart. Otis's success with the song was somewhat short-lived, and he briefly moved to King Records in 1961, where he worked with Johnny "Guitar" Watson.

In 1959, Otis auditioned the Coachella Valley, California band the Renes which featured a young Alan O'Day on vocals. Impressed, Otis recorded and produced the band performing three O'Day originals and a few covers at El Dorado Studios in Los Angeles. but the recordings were never released as most of the members of the Renes were minors.

In 1969, Otis landed a deal with Columbia Records and recorded the albums Cold Shot! and the sexually explicit Snatch and the Poontangs, both of which featured his son Shuggie and the singer Delmar "Mighty Mouth" Evans. A year later, he recorded a double live album of his band's performance at the Monterey Jazz Festival, Johnny Otis Show Live at Monterey! with Little Esther Phillips, Eddie "Cleanhead" Vinson, Pee Wee Crayton, Ivory Joe Hunter, and The Mighty Flea, among others. A portion of the performance was featured in the Clint Eastwood film Play Misty for Me.

Live at Monterey was released in 1971 by Epic Records. Reviewing it in Christgau's Record Guide: Rock Albums of the Seventies (1981), Robert Christgau said, "In-concert compilations are often incoherent, but the blues-style hard jive beloved of performer-turned-majordomo Otis has such formal integrity that this r&b spectacular moves smoothly for four sides. Some of the featured players are no more than Otis's hired hands, including guitarist Shuggie O. But (in ascending order) Roy Milton, Big Joe Turner, Ivory Joe Hunter, Little (?) Esther Phillips, Roy Brown, and Cleanhead Vinson are a cast that beats anything Richard Nader's ever put into the Garden."

Otis toured less in the 1970s. He started the Blues Spectrum label and released a series of thirteen albums, Rhythm and Blues Oldies, which featured the 1950s R&B artists Louis Jordan, Charles Brown, Big Joe Turner, Pee Wee Crayton, Joe Liggins, Gatemouth Moore, Roy Milton, Amos Milburn, Eddie "Cleanhead" Vinson, and Richard Berry, with three of those albums by Otis himself.

In the 1980s, Otis had a weekly radio show, airing Mondays from 8 to 11 p.m. on the Los Angeles radio station KPFK, on which he played records and received as guests R&B artists such as Screamin' Jay Hawkins. Otis also recorded with his sons, Shuggie (guitar) and Nicky (drums), releasing the albums The New Johnny Otis Show (Alligator, 1981), Johnny Otis! Johnny Otis! (Hawk Sound, 1984) and Otisology (Kent, 1986). In the summer of 1987, Otis hosted his own Red Beans & Rice R&B Music Festival in Los Angeles, which featured top-name acts and hosted a Southern-style red beans and rice cook-off. Otis released Spirit of the Black Territory Bands in 1992, for which he was nominated for a Grammy Award. He moved the festival to the city of San Dimas, where it ran annually in association with the Los Angeles County Department of Parks and Recreation for twenty years, until 2006.

Otis and his family moved from southern California to Sebastopol, California, a small apple-farming town in Sonoma County. He continued his weekly radio program from KPFK's sister station KPFA in Berkeley, California, which aired every Saturday from 9am to noon. Otis performed across the United States and Europe well through the 1990s, headlining the San Francisco Blues Festival in 1990 and 2000. In 1993, he opened the Johnny Otis Market in Sebastopol, a grocery/deli/cabaret where Otis and his band (now joined by his grandsons Lucky on bass and Eric on rhythm guitar) played sold-out shows every weekend until it closed its doors in 1995. He was inducted into the Rock and Roll Hall of Fame and the Blues Hall of Fame in 1994. He was inducted into the National Rhythm & Blues Hall of Fame in 2017.

== Advocacy and other work ==
In the 1960s, Otis entered journalism and politics. He lost an election for a seat in the California State Assembly. He then became deputy chief of staff to state Assemblyman, later, Democratic Congressman, Mervyn M. Dymally.

Otis was also an outspoken advocate for racial equality and Black self-determination. His 1968 book Listen to the Lambs, written in response to the 1965 Watts uprising, combined autobiography, political analysis, and more than thirty pages of eyewitness testimony from Black residents of Watts. Otis argued that amid persistent white racism, Black communities should prioritize economic independence and political control of their own communities, rather than push for social integration—even as racial inequality ultimately harmed white as well as Black Americans. Otis criticized systemic racism, police brutality, racist beauty standards, economic inequality, and the Vietnam War. He characterized racial disparities in health and life expectancy as consequences of social conditions rather than biology.

His opposition to racism extended throughout his career: he wrote for the Los Angeles Sentinel, supported and worked within Black political and cultural institutions, and used his radio and television programs to promote African American musicians and their history. Biographer George Lipsitz described Otis as a white musician who believed that in drawing on Black creativity, he was obliged to the culture from which he benefited. Otis later revisited the subject of racial conflict in his book Upside Your Head!, written in response to the 1992 Los Angeles uprising.

Otis founded and preached in the New Landmark Community Gospel Church, which held Sunday services in Santa Rosa, California. Landmark's worship services centered on Otis's preaching and the traditional-style performances of a vocal group and choir backed by his rhythm section and an organist. The church closed in mid-1998.

The Johnny Otis Show, relocated from KPFK to sister station KPFA in Berkeley, California, where it aired on Saturday mornings. After his market in Sebastopol opened in 1994, Otis broadcast from there, with his band playing live on the air, later broadcasting from the Powerhouse Brewing Co. After Otis's retirement in late 2004, his grandson Lucky hosted the show at KPFA for two years, until its final airing in late 2006, when Otis and his wife moved back to Los Angeles.

In 1980, Frank Zappa stated in a Trouser Press interview that he adopted his trademark mustache and soul patch because "it looked good on bluesman Johnny Otis, so I grew it."

He taught Music 15-B: Jazz, Blues and Popular Music in American Culture, a 3-unit Peralta Community College District class.

== Death ==
Otis died of natural causes on January 17, 2012, in the Altadena area of Los Angeles County. He died three days before Etta James, whom he had discovered in the early 1950s. He is interred with his wife at Mountain View Cemetery in Altadena, California, US.

== Discography ==
=== Chart singles ===
Year	Single	Artists	Chart Positions		
Year	Single	Artists	US Pop	US R&B	UK
1948	"That's Your Last Boogie"	Joe Swift with Johnny Otis & His Orchestra	–	10	–
1950	"Double Crossing Blues"	Johnny Otis Quintette, the Robins and Little Esther	–	1	–
1950	"Mistrustin' Blues" / "Misery"	Little Esther and Mel Walker with the Johnny Otis Orchestra / Little Esther with the Johnny Otis Orchestra	- -	1; 9	- -
1950	"Cry Baby"	The Johnny Otis Orchestra, Mel Walker and the Bluenotes	–	6	–
1950	"Cupid's Boogie"	Little Esther and Mel Walker with the Johnny Otis Orchestra	–	1	–
1950	"Deceivin' Blues"	Little Esther and Mel Walker with the Johnny Otis Orchestra	–	4	–
1950	"Dreamin' Blues"	Mel Walker with the Johnny Otis Orchestra	–	8	–
1950	"Wedding Boogie" / "Far Away Blues (Xmas Blues)"	Johnny Otis' Congregation: Little Esther, Mel Walker, Lee Graves / The Johnny Otis Orchestra with Little Esther and Mel Walker	- -	6; 6	- -
1950	"Rockin' Blues"	The Johnny Otis Orchestra with Mel Walker	–	2	–
1951	"Gee Baby" / "Mambo Boogie"	The Johnny Otis Orchestra	- -	2; 4	- -
1951	"All Nite Long"	The Johnny Otis Orchestra	–	6	–
1952	"Sunset To Dawn"	Mel Walker with the Johnny Otis Orchestra	–	10	–
1952	"Call Operator 210"	Johnny Otis and His Orchestra featuring Mel Walker	–	4	–
1957	"Ma (He's Making Eyes at Me)"	The Johnny Otis Show (Johnny Otis and His Orchestra with Marie Adams and the Three Tons of Joy)	–	–	2
1958	"Bye Bye Baby"	The Johnny Otis Show (vocal by Marie Adams & Johnny Otis)	–	–	20
1958	"Willie and the Hand Jive"	The Johnny Otis Show	9	1	–
1958	"Crazy Country Hop"	The Johnny Otis Show	87	–	–
1959	"Castin' My Spell"	The Johnny Otis Show (vocal by Johnny Otis & Marci Lee)	52	–	–
1960	"Mumblin' Mosie"	The Johnny Otis Show	80	–	–
1969	"Country Girl"	The Johnny Otis Show (vocal by Delmar Evans & Johnny Otis)	–	29	–
