= Billboard Top R&B Records of 1951 =

Billboard Top R&B Records of 1951 is made up of two year-end charts compiled by Billboard magazine ranking the year's top rhythm and blues records based on record sales and juke box plays.

| Retail year-end | Juke box year-end | Title | Artist(s) | Label |
|---|---|---|---|---|
| 1 | 1 | "Sixty Minute Man" | The Dominoes | Federal |
| 2 | 2 | "Black Night" | Charles Brown | Aladdin |
| 3 | 14 | "Teardrops from My Eyes" | Ruth Brown | Atlantic |
| 4 | 5 | "Chains of Love" | Big Joe Turner | Atlantic |
| 5 | 9 | "Don't You Know I Love You" | The Clovers | Atlantic |
| 6 | 17 | "Please Send Me Someone to Love" | Percy Mayfield | Specialty |
| 7 | 4 | "I'm Waiting Just for You" | Lucky Millinder | King |
| 8 | 11 | "The Glory of Love" | The Five Keys | Aladdin |
| 9 | 3 | "Rocket 88" | Jackie Brenston | Chess |
| 10 | 8 | "Rockin' Blues" | Johnny Otis, Mel Walker | Savoy |
| 11 | 12 | "Bad, Bad Whiskey" | Amos Milburn | Aladdin |
| 12 | 21 | "Fool, Fool, Fool" | The Clovers | Atlantic |
| 13 | 13 | "Lost Love" | Percy Mayfield | Specialty |
| 14 | 15 | "I'm in the Mood" | John Lee Hooker | Modern |
| 15 | 10 | "I Got Loaded" | Peppermint Harris | Aladdin |
| 16 | NR | "Anytime, Any Place, Anywhere" | Joe Morris | Atlantic |
| 17 | 22 | "Too Young" | Nat King Cole | Capitol |
| 18 | 26 | "Red's Boogie" | Piano Red | RCA Victor |
| 19 | NR | "Seven Long Days" | Charles Brown | Aladdin |
| 20 | NR | "Do Something for Me" | The Dominoes | Federal |
| 21 | NR | "Don't Take Your Love from Me" | Joe Morris | Atlantic |
| 22 | 24 | "I Apologize" | Billy Eckstine | M-G-M |
| 23 | 16 | "Tend to Your Business" | James Wayne | Swingtime |
| 24 | 19 | "Smooth Sailing" | Ella Fitzgerald | Decca |
| 25 | 18 | "I Will Wait" | The Four Buddies | Savoy |
| 28 | 6 | "T" 99 Blues | Jimmy Nelson | RPM |
| 29 | NR | "Baby, Let Me Hold Your Hand" | Ray Charles | Swingtime |
| 30 | NR | "Flamingo" | Earl Bostic | King |
| NR | 2 | "Black Night" | Charles Brown | Aladdin |
| NR | 7 | "Chica Boo" | Lloyd Glenn | Swingtime |
| NR | 20 | "How High the Moon" | Les Paul & Mary Ford | Capitol |
| NR | 23 | "Castle Rock" | Johnny Hodges | Mercury |
| NR | 25 | "Bloodshot Eyes" | Wynonie Harris | King |
| NR | 27 | "Come On-a My House" | Rosemary Clooney | Columbia |
| NR | 27 | "Hey, Little Girl" | John Godfrey Trio | Chess |
| NR | 29 | "Tennessee Waltz Blues" | Stick McGhee | Atlantic |
| NR | 30 | "All Nite Long" | Johnny Otis Orchestra | Savoy |

== See also ==
- Billboard No. 1 R&B singles of 1951
- Billboard year-end top 30 singles of 1951
- 1951 in music
