= List of Billboard number-one R&B songs of 1951 =

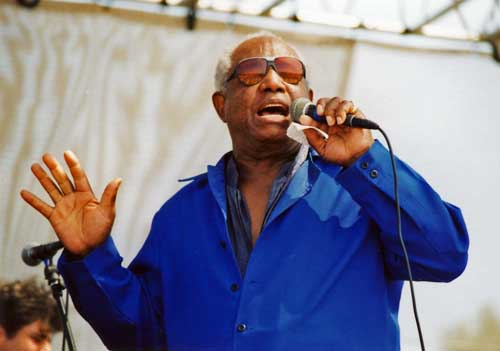
Jimmy Nelson (pictured in 1996) reached number one in 1951 with "T'99 Blues" but would never achieve another charting song in his career.

In 1951, Billboard magazine published Best Selling Retail Rhythm & Blues Records and Most Played Juke Box Rhythm & Blues Records, two charts covering the top-performing songs in the United States in rhythm and blues (R&B) and related African-American-oriented music genres. The charts, one based on sales in stores and the other on plays in jukeboxes, are considered part of the lineage of the magazine's multimetric R&B chart launched in 1958, which since 2005 has been published under the title Hot R&B/Hip-Hop Songs.

In the issue of Billboard dated January 6, Ruth Brown was at number one on the juke box chart with "Teardrops from My Eyes", retaining its position from the final chart of 1950, and Amos Milburn moved into the top spot on the best sellers listing with "Bad, Bad Whiskey". Beginning in early March, ballad singer and pianist Charles Brown achieved the year's longest unbroken spell at number one on both listings with his song "Black Night"; it spent 14 consecutive weeks atop the juke box chart and 13 consecutive weeks at number one on the best sellers chart. The longest-running number one on the best sellers chart overall, however, was "Sixty Minute Man" by the Dominoes, with 14 non-consecutive weeks in the top spot, including one tied with another song. The only act with more than one R&B chart-topper in 1951 was the pioneering doo-wop group the Clovers, who reached number one on the best sellers chart with both "Don't You Know I Love You" and "Fool, Fool, Fool"; the latter also topped the juke box chart and was the year's final chart-topper on that listing.

In June, "Rocket 88" by Jackie Brenston and his Delta Cats topped both charts, spending three weeks at number one on the best sellers chart and five on the juke box listing. The recording was by the regular backing band of singer Ike Turner, with saxophone player Brenston providing the vocals and receiving featured credit. The song has been cited as pivotal in the development of rock and roll music, with some critics considering it to be the first rock and roll record. Despite the success of the song, it would prove to be the only charting single of Brenston's career. The same fate befell Jimmy Nelson and the Peter Rabbit Trio, who spent a single week at number one on the juke box listing in November with their first chart entry, "T' 99 Blues", but would never chart again. Several other acts achieved their first number ones in 1951, beginning with the Dominoes with "Sixty Minute Man". The Clovers reached the peak position on the juke box chart with "Don't You Know I Love You", their first charting song, and added their second number one later in the year with their next single. The Five Keys also reached the top spot with their first chart entry, their recording of Benny Goodman's 1936 song "The Glory of Love". In November and December, "Peppermint" Harris, Tab Smith and Earl Bostic all gained their first number ones, but in each case it would prove to be their final charting single.

== Chart history ==
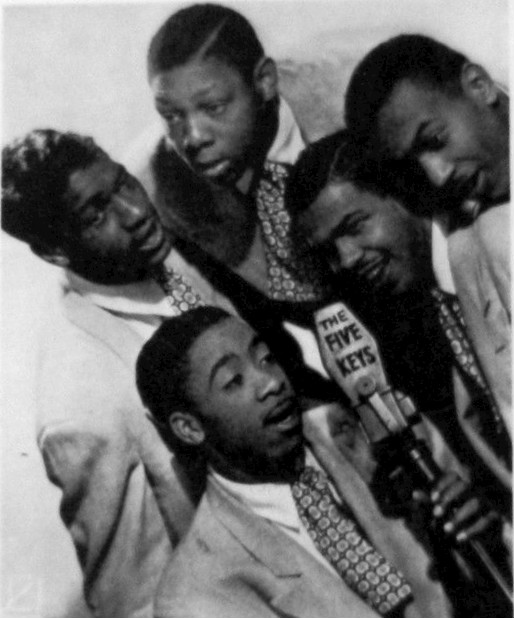
The Five Keys reached number one with "The Glory of Love".

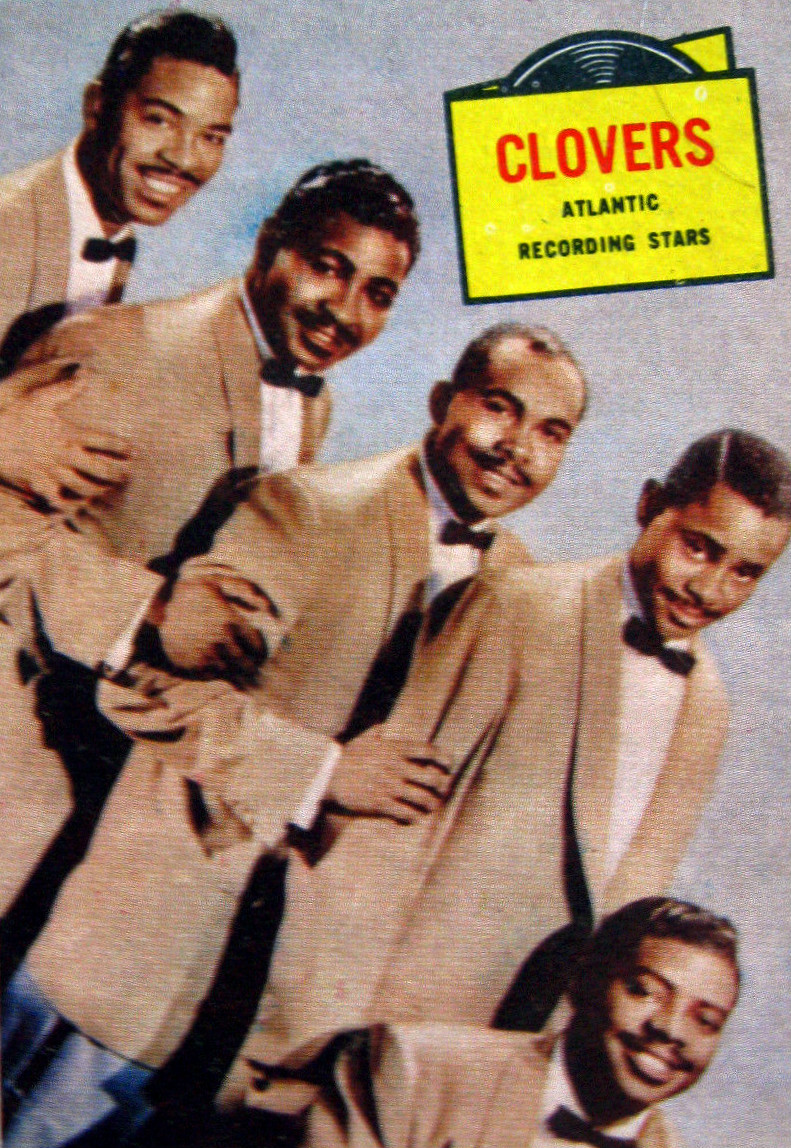
Two songs by the Clovers reached the top spot in 1951.

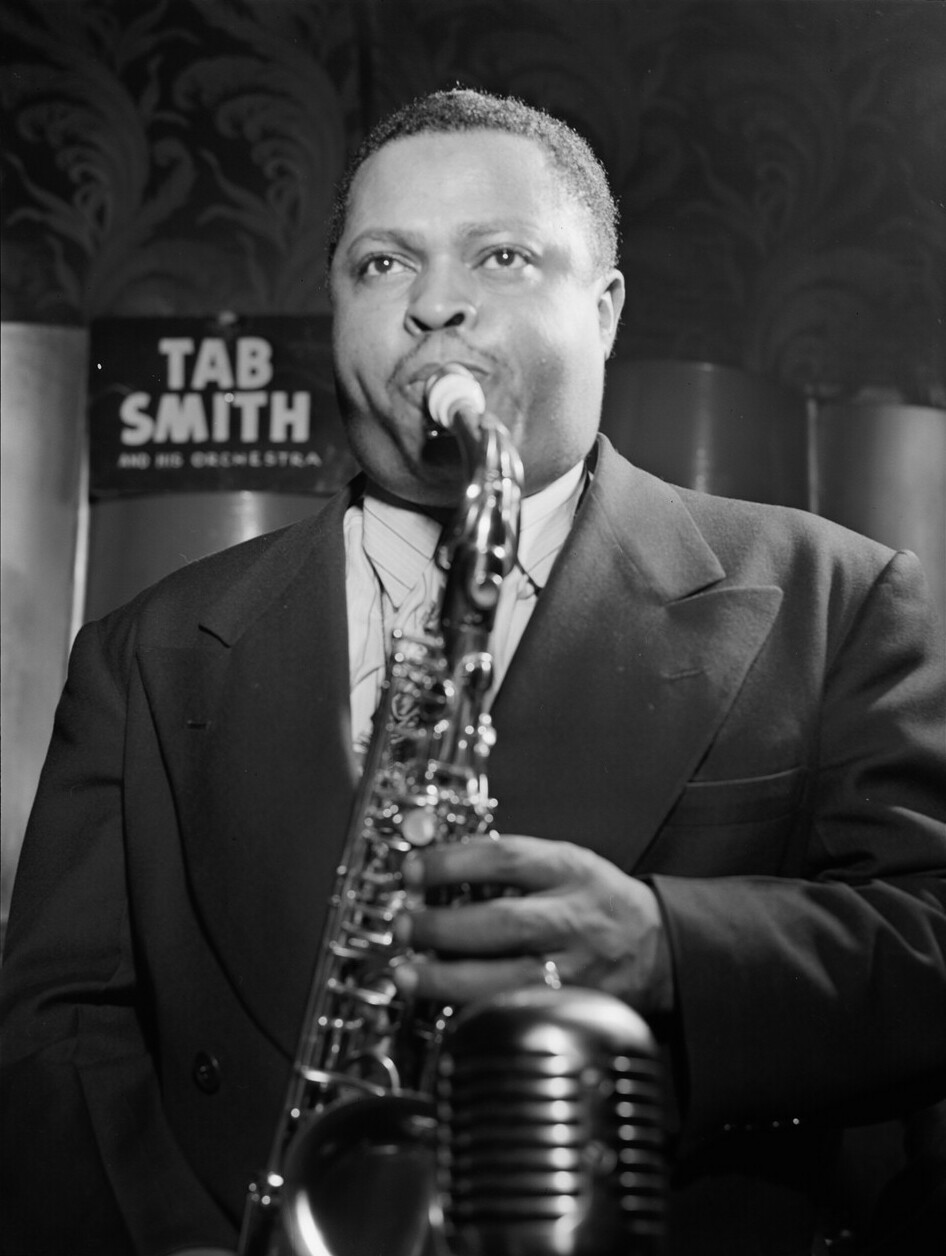
Tab Smith's "Because of You" topped the best sellers chart but fell short of the top of the juke box listing.

Chart history
Issue date	Juke Box		Best Sellers		Ref.
Issue date	Title	Artist(s)	Title	Artist(s)	Ref.
January 6	"Teardrops from My Eyes"	Ruth Brown	"Bad, Bad Whiskey"	Amos Milburn	
January 13	"Teardrops from My Eyes"	Ruth Brown	"Bad, Bad Whiskey"	Amos Milburn	
January 20	"Teardrops from My Eyes"	Ruth Brown	"Bad, Bad Whiskey"	Amos Milburn	
January 27	"Teardrops from My Eyes"	Ruth Brown	"Teardrops from My Eyes"	Ruth Brown	
February 3	"Teardrops from My Eyes"	Ruth Brown	"Teardrops from My Eyes"	Ruth Brown	
February 10	"Teardrops from My Eyes"	Ruth Brown	"Teardrops from My Eyes"	Ruth Brown	
February 17	"Teardrops from My Eyes"	Ruth Brown	"Teardrops from My Eyes"	Ruth Brown	
February 24	"Bad, Bad Whiskey"	Amos Milburn	"Teardrops from My Eyes"	Ruth Brown	
March 3	"Black Night"	Charles Brown	"Teardrops from My Eyes"	Ruth Brown	
March 10	"Black Night"	Charles Brown	"Black Night"	Charles Brown	
March 17	"Black Night"	Charles Brown	"Black Night"	Charles Brown	
March 24	"Black Night"	Charles Brown	"Black Night"	Charles Brown	
March 31	"Black Night"	Charles Brown	"Black Night"	Charles Brown	
April 7	"Black Night"	Charles Brown	"Black Night"	Charles Brown	
April 14	"Black Night"	Charles Brown	"Black Night"	Charles Brown	
April 21	"Black Night"	Charles Brown	"Black Night"	Charles Brown	
April 28	"Black Night"	Charles Brown	"Black Night"	Charles Brown	
May 5	"Black Night"	Charles Brown	"Black Night"	Charles Brown	
May 12	"Black Night"	Charles Brown	"Black Night"	Charles Brown	
May 19	"Black Night"	Charles Brown	"Black Night"	Charles Brown	
May 26	"Black Night"	Charles Brown	"Black Night"	Charles Brown	
June 2	"Black Night"	Charles Brown	"Black Night"	Charles Brown	
June 9	"Chica Boo"	Lloyd Glenn	"Rocket 88"	Jackie Brenston and his Delta Cats	
June 16	"Chica Boo"	Lloyd Glenn	"Rocket 88"	Jackie Brenston and his Delta Cats	
June 23	"Rocket 88"	Jackie Brenston and his Delta Cats	"Rocket 88"	Jackie Brenston and his Delta Cats	
June 30	"Rocket 88"	Jackie Brenston and his Delta Cats	"Sixty Minute Man"	The Dominoes	
July 7	"Rocket 88"	Jackie Brenston and his Delta Cats	"Sixty Minute Man"	The Dominoes	
July 14	"Rocket 88"	Jackie Brenston and his Delta Cats	"Sixty Minute Man"	The Dominoes	
July 21	"Rocket 88"	Jackie Brenston and his Delta Cats	"Sixty Minute Man"	The Dominoes	
July 28	"Sixty Minute Man"	The Dominoes	"Sixty Minute Man"	The Dominoes	
August 4	"Sixty Minute Man"	The Dominoes	"Sixty Minute Man"	The Dominoes	
August 11	"Sixty Minute Man"	The Dominoes	"Sixty Minute Man"	The Dominoes	
August 18	"Sixty Minute Man"	The Dominoes	"Sixty Minute Man"	The Dominoes	
August 25	"Sixty Minute Man"	The Dominoes	"Sixty Minute Man"	The Dominoes	
September 1	"Sixty Minute Man"	The Dominoes	"Don't You Know I Love You"	The Clovers	
September 8	"Sixty Minute Man"	The Dominoes	"Don't You Know I Love You"	The Clovers	
September 15	"Sixty Minute Man"	The Dominoes	"Sixty Minute Man"	The Dominoes	
September 22^{[a]}	"Sixty Minute Man"	The Dominoes	"The Glory of Love"	The Five Keys	
September 22^{[a]}	"Sixty Minute Man"	The Dominoes	"Sixty Minute Man"	The Dominoes	
September 29	"Sixty Minute Man"	The Dominoes	"Sixty Minute Man"	The Dominoes	
October 6	"Sixty Minute Man"	The Dominoes	"The Glory of Love"	The Five Keys	
October 13	"Sixty Minute Man"	The Dominoes	"Sixty Minute Man"	The Dominoes	
October 20	"The Glory of Love"	The Five Keys	"Sixty Minute Man"	The Dominoes	
October 27	"The Glory of Love"	The Five Keys	"The Glory of Love"	The Five Keys	
November 3	"T' 99 Blues"	Jimmy Nelson and the Peter Rabbit Trio	"The Glory of Love"	The Five Keys	
November 10	"I Got Loaded"	"Peppermint" Harris	"Fool, Fool, Fool"	The Clovers	
November 17	"I'm in the Mood"	John Lee Hooker	"Fool, Fool, Fool"	The Clovers	
November 24	"I'm in the Mood"	John Lee Hooker	"Fool, Fool, Fool"	The Clovers	
December 1	"I Got Loaded"	"Peppermint" Harris	"Fool, Fool, Fool"	The Clovers	
December 8	"I'm in the Mood"	John Lee Hooker	"Because of You"	Tab Smith and his Orchestra	
December 15	"I'm in the Mood"	John Lee Hooker	"Because of You"	Tab Smith and his Orchestra	
December 22^{[a]}	"Fool, Fool, Fool"	The Clovers	"Fool, Fool, Fool"	The Clovers	
December 22^{[a]}	"Fool, Fool, Fool"	The Clovers	"I Got Loaded"	"Peppermint" Harris	
December 29	"Fool, Fool, Fool"	The Clovers	"Flamingo"	Earl Bostic and his Orchestra	

a. Two songs tied for number one on the best sellers chart in this issue.
