= Ed Wiley Jr. =

American jazz saxophonist (1930–2010)

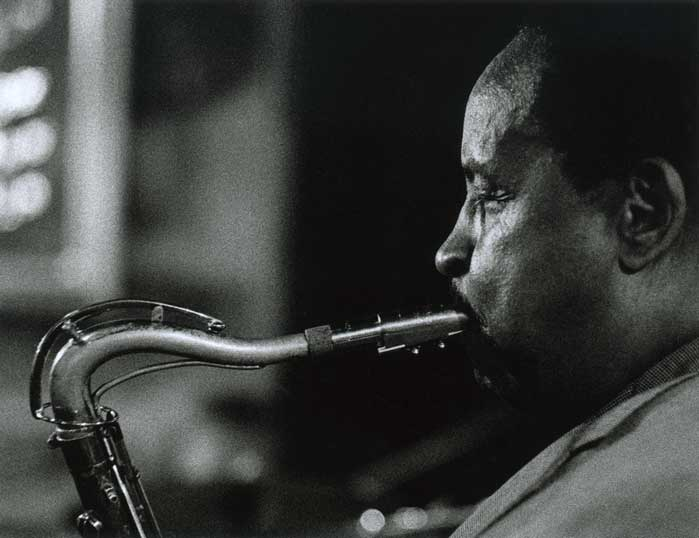
- Wiley, Washington, D.C., concert, 1996.

Background information
- Born: March 14, 1930; Fourth Ward, Houston, Texas, United States
- Died: September 27, 2010 (aged 80) Garner, North Carolina, United States
- Genre: Jazz
- Occupation: Musician
- Instrument: Tenor saxophone

Ed Wiley Jr. (March 14, 1930 – September 27, 2010) was an American tenor saxophonist whose big sound and soulful expression helped lay the foundation for early blues, R&B and what would later come to be known as "rock and roll" music.

During the late 1940s and early 1950s, when brash, honking tenormen were the driving force behind Texas blues and R&B, Wiley's bold, soulful delivery established him as a mainstay of the post-World War II music world. In later years, after more than a decade away from touring and recording, Wiley would re-emerge on the jazz scene, touring and recording with many of the leading musicians of the genre. Although Wiley never abandoned the rich, soulful style he honed during his early years, his later recordings showed a greater appreciation for bebop, and he collaborated with such stalwarts of the bebop era as drummers Mickey Roker, Bobby Durham and Ben Riley; bassists Keter Betts and Charles Fambrough; and pianists John Hicks, Kenny Barron and Sir Roland Hanna.

== Early life ==
Wiley was born in Houston's Fourth Ward. His parents divorced when he was very young, and Wiley was raised by his mother, Vanilla Yancy, and two sisters. Wiley attended Booker T. Washington High School, where he played clarinet in the marching band and concert band. In his final year of high school, Wiley, who cites Lester Young, Arnett Cobb and Gene Ammons as his leading influences, began playing saxophone at local dances. By his 18th birthday, Wiley had recorded on several upstart Texas labels and was a regular at such venues as Houston's Eldorado Ballroom and the Bronze Peacock, and Don's Keyhole in San Antonio.

== "Texas tenor" legacy ==
Wiley is among a long lineage of “Texas tenor” reedmen, known for their bold, bluesy, and often boisterous way of blowing. They included such saxophone legends as James Clay, Arnett Cobb, King Curtis, Booker Ervin, Illinois Jacquet, David "Fathead" Newman, Buddy Tate and Donald Wilkerson. There were also several other horn players – such as Chicagoan Gene Ammons, Floridian Willis Jackson and Missourian Lester Young – who share the Texas tenor pedigree because of their sound rather than their hometown.

The monthly Cadence Review of Jazz & Blues: Creative Improvised Music writes that Wiley has an "appreciation of the classic 'Texas tenor' sound of people such as Arnett Cobb and Illinois Jacquet. But his sound is more polished and urbane compared with those past masters; it’s big and soulful, but never overbearing."

"The Texas tenor sound was an aggressive approach to whatever type of tune you were doing," Wiley told American Music Center writer Eugene Holley in a 1995 interview. "It's a big sound, and soulful as can be. You had tenor players from that area, and you grew up hearing that sound. …I played the carnival circuit. They had what you call tent shows before the main show, and the band would play in what they called the 'valley,' to get the people in the crowd interested enough to come into the tent. There were no microphones out there, and you had to really dig down deep in your horn and get some volume. So it strengthened your chops and you were used to that big, full sound. When I was coming up in high school [Booker T. Washington], I played in the marching bands on the football field, and you got strong doing that too."

== Early career ==
New York record producers Bob and Morty Shad decided that it was Wiley's full sound that would be the common denominator on the dozens of blues recordings they would issue on their Sittin' in With and Mercury labels. Thus, in addition to the numerous releases under his own name, Wiley served as the band leader backing a long list of Texas bluesmen, including Clarence "Gatemouth" Brown, James "Widemouth" Brown, Nelson Carson, Goree Carter, Peppermint Harris, Smokey Hogg, Elmore Nixon, Teddy Reynolds and King Tut, among others.

Wiley already had gained some local notoriety a year or two prior to meeting the Shads, performing throughout Texas and Louisiana with such notables as Gatemouth, Amos Milburn, Big Mama Thornton, Perry Cain and Henry Hayes. Between 1948 and 1949, Wiley appeared on several sides for Freedom, Gold Star and Jade records.

But Wiley got his first taste of national fame when a 78 that he recorded in 1949 for Sittin' In With climbed the R&B charts in the spring of 1950. "Cry Cry Baby", which featured fellow Houstonian Teddy Reynolds on piano and vocals, was a Cash Box hit, making it to No. 3 on The Billboard.

As blues historian Brian Baumgartner writes in his biography of blues singer Piney Brown, "Wiley had previously been part of a massive 1950 recording session held in Houston by New York producer Bob Shad for his Sittin' In With record label. …Ed Wiley must have been a very busy musician that year, as his name also shows up on a number of Houston-based Mercury sessions at various times during 1951."

In late 1950, Wiley left Houston for good, heading to Baltimore to live with a relative and further his music education. It was at the Olde Mill in Baltimore that he met Brown. The two teamed up for a series of tours, adding pianist and fellow crooner Roosevelt Wardell. Wardell was just 16 years old at the time he met Wiley, but he had gained some notoriety of his own for the regional hit "Bernice" b/w "She Drinks Too Much Wine", on the Melford label.

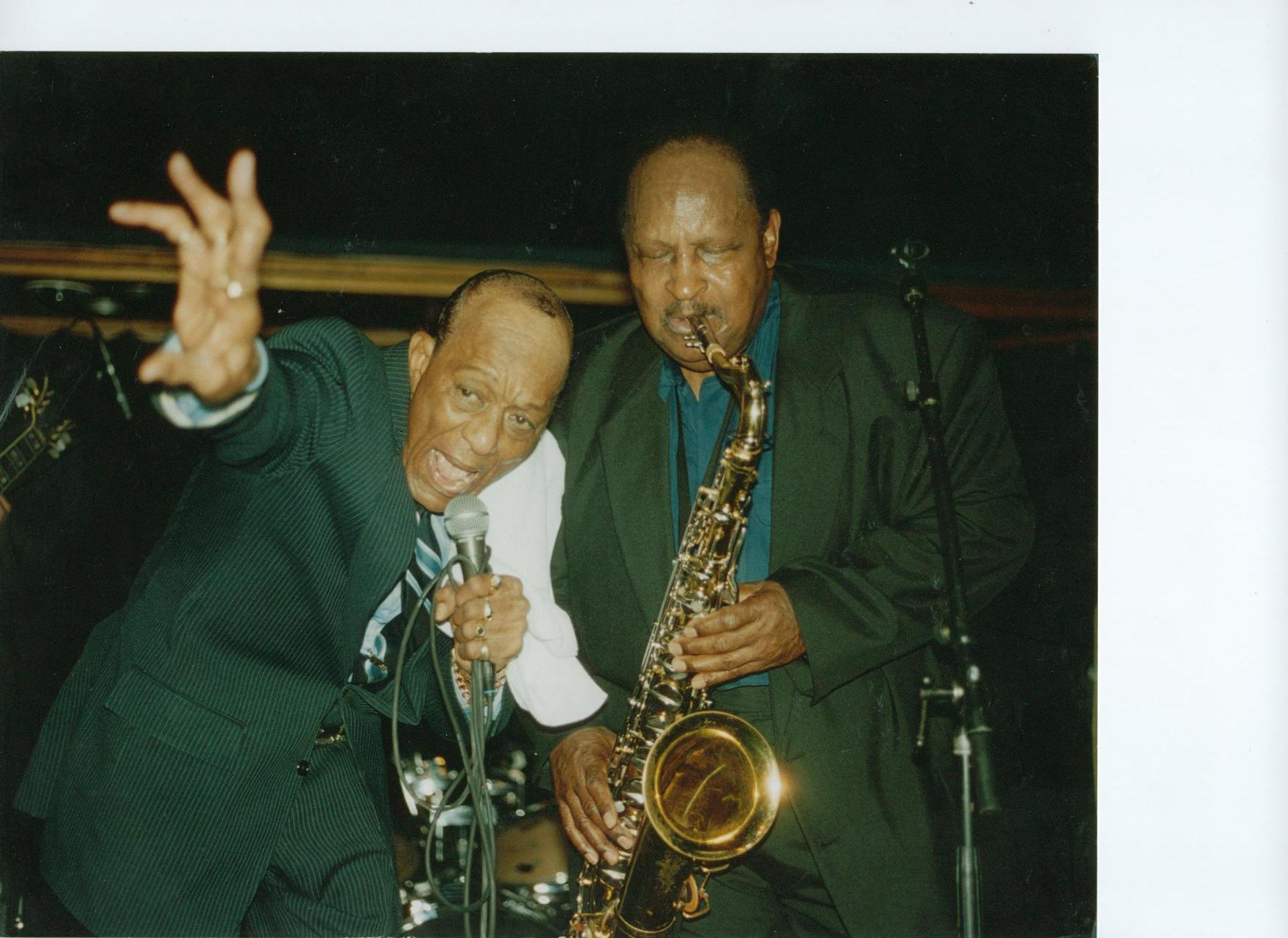
After a half-century, Wiley reunites with blues shouter Piney Brown at the Blues Estafette, Utrecht, The Netherlands, 2000.

It did not take long for the group to land a spot with the Shaw Artists agency, which booked them throughout the South and Midwest. After some months on the road, they again bumped into Shad, this time in Shreveport, La. At a radio station there, they cut four more sides for Sittin' In With, with Wiley as the leader: "Pack Up, Move Out" and "Molasses, Molasses", both featuring Brown on vocals; and "West Indies Blues" and "Jumpin' With the Blues", instrumentals.

The following year, Brown left the group, going on to record for various labels. But Wardell would remain with Wiley, recording together on numerous other occasions, including sessions for Atlantic, Rockin', DeLuxe and King Records. Wiley and Wardell would remain close friends until Wardell died following a stroke-induced illness. Wardell died in 1999 at the Delaware Hospital for the Chronically Ill in Smyrna, Delaware.

== Birth of rock ==
In 1952, the Continental booking agency paired Wiley with singer Jackie Brenston, who had released the hit "Rocket 88" for Chess one year earlier. Brenston had been one of pianist Ike Turner's Delta Cats, from Clarksdale, Miss. "Rocket 88", widely considered the first "rock-and-roll" record, had sizzled for a spell, but the fervor over the R&B hit soon died, about the same time that Wiley's stock was rising. Continental also suggested that Wiley include two other Clarksdale musicians, blues crooner "Screamin'" Johnny O'Neal and guitarist Earl Hooker, one of the most versatile and gifted guitarists of the early 1950s. In the Encyclopedia of the Blues, Gérard Herzhaft describes Hooker as a guitar "virtuoso". Scott Stanton, in The Tombstone Tourist, effuses that Hooker had "a fretboard touch so smooth and clean, one would be hard-pressed to find a more brilliant and more underrated slide guitarist residing in Chicago during the '50s and ’60s… ." And blues master B.B. King said that "to me he is the best of modern guitarists. Period. With the slide he was the best. It was nobody else like him[;] he was just one of a kind."

It is important to mention this influential musician, because Hooker's collaboration with Wiley marked his introduction to the recording world. "The Hooker/O'Neal/Wiley combination was a potentially promising one, and it drew the attention of the talent scout for the Cincinnati-based King Recording Company who attended one of their tear-it-up performances at a Bradenton [FL.] club," writes French blues historian Sebastian Danchin in his biography Earl Hooker, Blues Master.

While the combo, which also included Wardell on piano, recorded several sides for King, only two, "Johnny Sings the Blues" (featuring an "alert bebop tenor sax solo contributed by Ed Wiley") b/w "I've Seen So Many Hard Times" (a slow, soulful moaning blues showcasing O'Neal's serious blues chops) were ever released.

While performing an extended tour date at the Top Hat in Louisville, Ky., in 1952, Wiley allowed a local singer named Harvey Fuqua to sit in. By the time Wiley's group departed a few weeks later, Fuqua and his singing partner, Bobby Lester, were members of the band. Fuqua – who went on to form the legendary doo-wop group The Moonglows and to produce numerous hits for Motown records – would always credit Wiley with giving him his first break in music and for teaching him how to sing blues and jump blues, precursors to rock and roll and modern soul music. Prior to joining Wiley, Fuqua and Lester specialized in vocalese, a style of singing where improvised solos are replaced with words. "They joined tenor sax man Ed Wiley's band for a tour of the South," writes Fuqua biographer Steve Walker. "Wiley featured a variety of jump and blues tunes, and the young singers developed a wider repertoire from this experience."

When popular disc jockey Alan Freed – importantly, the man credited with coining the term "rock and roll" – heard the remodeled songsters, he began managing and promoting the duo, and prompted them to change their name to "The Moonglows". Writes Washington Post reporter Terence McArdle: "They also performed on Freed's touring rock-and-roll revues and in the movies 'Rock, Rock, Rock' (1956) and 'Mister Rock and Roll' (1957)."

Some blues aficionados contend that Texas blues pioneers can justifiably lay claim to the creation of rock and roll. Thomas Kreason, executive director of the Texas Musicians Museum in Hillsboro, for one, is among those who argue that Wiley studio mate Goree Carter's seminal "Rock Awhile" was actually the first rock and roll recording. He notes a distinctive guitar rift as the song modulates, a technique later adopted by Chuck Berry and other early rock-and-roll stars, and he reminds that Carter's 1949 Freedom recording was released a full two years ahead of Brenston's "Rocket 88".

In fact, southern Black musicians had been playing rock-and-roll-sounding music – albeit under a different moniker – long before either of those recordings. It is doubtful, however, that Ed Wiley, Goree Carter, Jackie Brenston, Ike Turner, Earl Hooker, Harvey Fuqua or any of the 1940s- and 1950s-era architects of rock and roll realized the historic role they would play in the development of that genre or other forms of modern music.

After moving from Baltimore to Philadelphia in the early 1950s, Wiley's bands took on a distinctive new look for the next several years. He would only occasionally revisit the road, joining Big Joe Turner, Al Hibbler and Brook Benton, among others. In 1954, Wiley married singer Maye Robinson, whom he had signed with the band the previous year while touring through Chester, Pa. Over the next several years, his groups often featured Maye – sometimes leading a Supremes-like trio, called The Inversions.

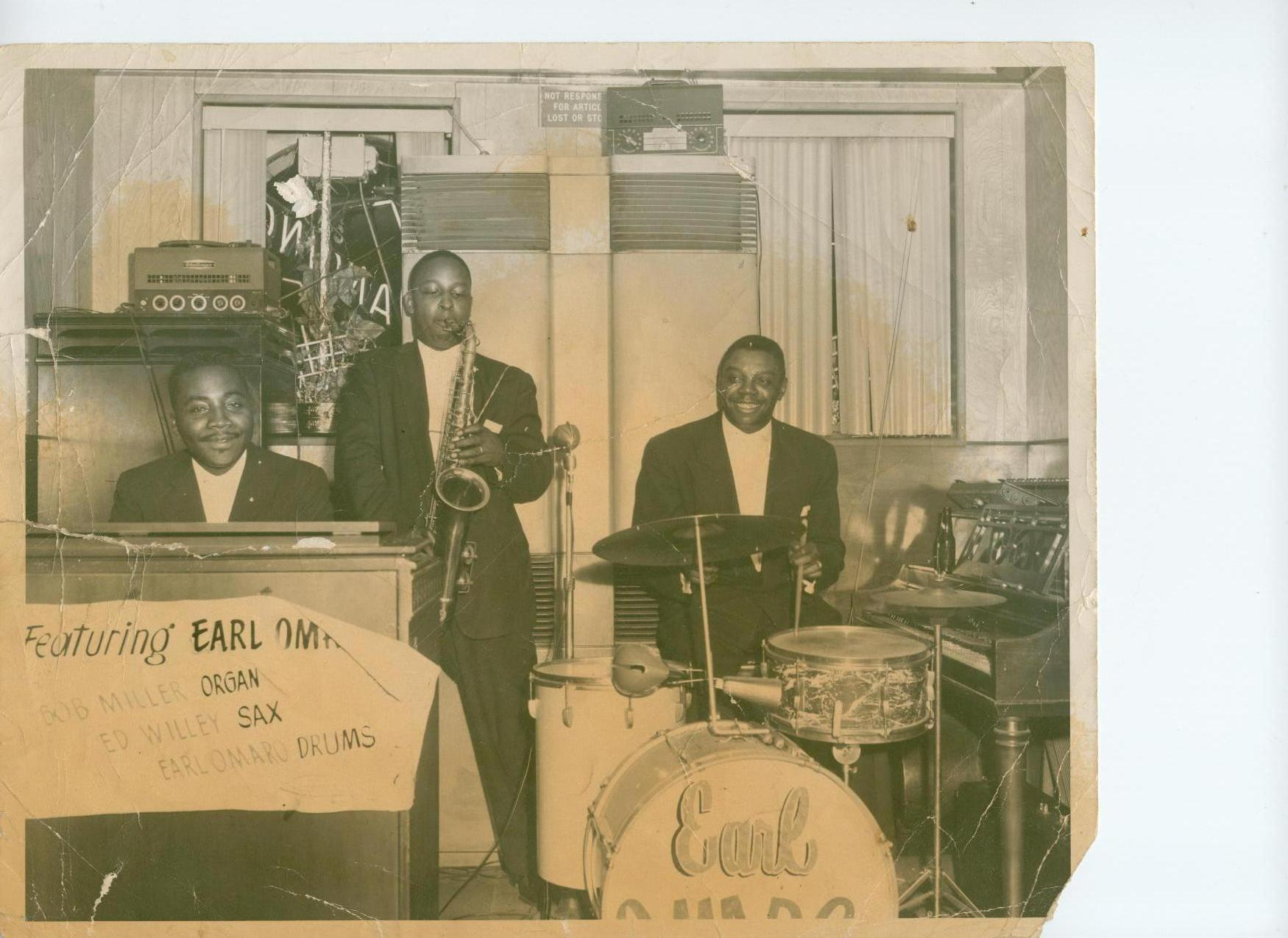
Wiley with drummer Earl Omaro and organist Bill Miller, Baltimore, 1957.

Having worked in Baltimore and New York with organist Fabulous Preston, Wiley discovered that his favorite ensembles were organ trios. He capitalized on the organ craze that had engulfed the City of Brotherly Love during the mid- to late-'50s, and began featuring such organists as Shirley Scott, Bill Hathaway and Bill Miller. "[Scott], was a piano player in Philly, and she had never played Hammond organ before," Holley quotes Wiley on his liner notes for "In Remembrance", which features Scott on piano. "I was the first group that she ever played organ with. She's been a heck of a musician for as long as I've ever known her. She's a heck of an arranger, and she did some of the arrangements on this recording."

Hathaway would appear with Wiley on his 1971 release "Stretchin' Out", a funky, driving instrumental with organ, trumpets, bass, drums and percussion. The reverse side, "Young Generation", a call for youths to guide a war- and race-obsessed nation toward peace, showed for the first time that Wiley could also sing. The 45 was recorded for Na-Cat records, a small Philadelphia imprint owned by Nate and Cathy Strand.

By 1960, Wiley had given up the road altogether, becoming a machinist and taking local and regional gigs. But he still appeared with many of Philadelphia's leading jazz and R&B exponents of the day, including trumpeter Johnny Coles, and singers Harold Melvin, Billy Paul and Teddy Pendergrass. His Na-Cat release would be his last recording for the next nine years. From 1971 to 1984, Wiley – now with seven children to support – played only in church on Sunday mornings.

== Later years ==
In 1980, he recorded a gospel LP, My Tribute. The album, on the Chattanooga, Tenn.-based Forward in Faith label, featured his wife on a bluesy original vocal, "Isn't It Wonderful"; his oldest son, Ed III, on percussions; and his next-to-oldest son, Duane, on drums. The uneven recording – a mixture of tunes that included everything from a Black gospel choir to a classically trained White singer – got little radio exposure outside of a few Christian-oriented stations.

By the mid-1980s, Wiley, then recently divorced, began touring again. In 1993, he teamed up with former Jazz Messenger bassist Charles Fambrough, who produced Wiley's first recording in more than a dozen years, Until Sunrise, on Swing Records, a label founded by Ed III. In addition to Fambrough, the date included other noted jazz musicians, such as drummer Bobby Durham and Kool & the Gang trombonist Clifford Adams.

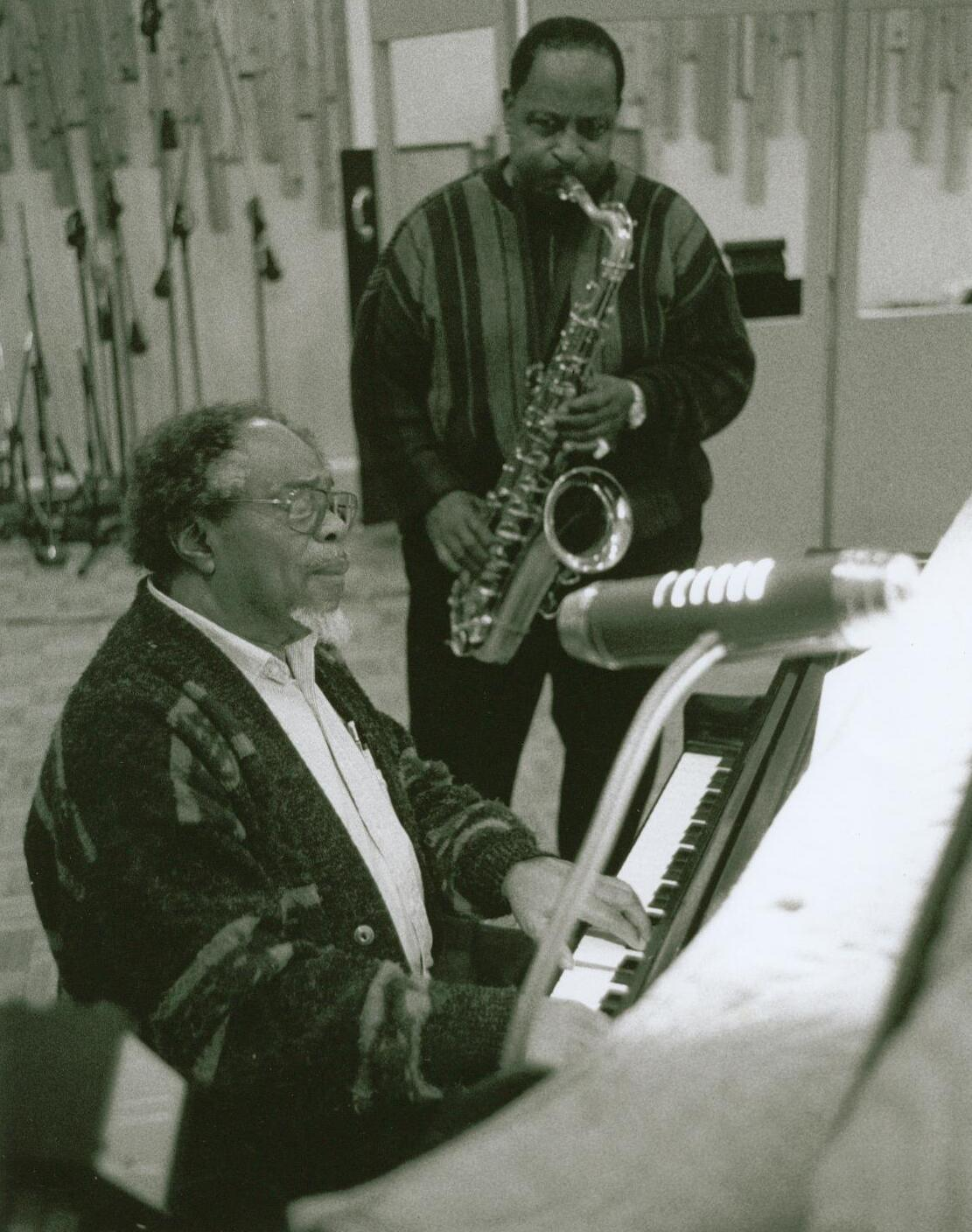
Wiley and Sir Roland Hanna during Brooklyn session, 2001.

But it was 1995's "In Remembrance", also on Swing, that marked Wiley's re-emergence as a force in the music world. The recording brought together a who's who of jazz greats, including his longtime friend Shirley Scott; bass veteran Milt Hinton and bass newcomer David Ephross, Durham and Mickey Roker on drums; Wycliffe Gordon on trombone; and trumpeter Terell Stafford. On this offering, Wiley connects the Black musical experience, from the Negro spiritual to bebop.

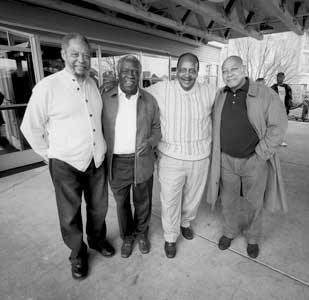
r-l:pianist Kenny Barron, Wiley, bassist Keter Betts and drummer Ben Riley after recording "About the Soul," in Oakland, 2005.

Following the release, USA Today called Wiley "jazz's comeback kid", adding that few match his "guttural sound. …He's honed a rich, gospel-like sax tone that also borrows from R&B and jazz." Two months later, The Washington Post noted: "Whether he's playing the blues, counting his blessings or paying homage on 'In Remembrance,' veteran saxophonist Ed Wiley Jr. Projects the resonant sound and soulful assurance so closely associated with the 'Texas Tenor' tradition. No matter that he long ago moved north and settled in Philadelphia. He's still got the touch."

Wiley would return to the studio frequently throughout the 2000s, always surrounded by a cross generation of renowned accompanists, including pianists Kenny Barron, Roland Hanna and John Hicks; trombonist Al Grey; trumpeters Nicholas Payton and John Swana; organist Joey DeFrancesco; and guitarists Mark Elf, Kevin McNeal and Jimmy Ponder; and drummer Ben Riley.

In 2000, after 48 years, Wiley and blues singer Piney Brown reunited to perform at the Blues Estafette, a revue featuring the greats of blues, in Utrecht, The Netherlands.

In February 2010, Wiley moved to Garner, North Carolina, to live with his oldest son.

Wiley died on September 27, 2010, in Garner, at the age of 80, after an injury from a fall.

Ed Wiley Jr. was interred in Poplar Springs Cemetery in Garner, North Carolina.
