= List of jump blues musicians =

The following is a list of jump blues musicians.

- Alberta Adams
- Sil Austin
- LaVern Baker
- Big Maybelle
- Big Three Trio
- Calvin Boze
- Tiny Bradshaw
- Jackie Brenston
- Nappy Brown
- Roy Brown
- Ruth Brown
- Arnett Cobb
- Floyd Dixon
- Willie Dixon
- H-Bomb Ferguson
- Jimmy Forrest
- Clarence Garlow
- Stomp Gordon
- Tiny Grimes
- Peppermint Harris
- Wynonie Harris
- Joe Houston
- Bull Moose Jackson
- Willis "Gator" Jackson
- Illinois Jacquet
- Buddy Johnson
- Eddie Johnson
- Ella Johnson
- Louis Jordan
- Al Killian
- Annie Laurie
- Julia Lee
- Joe Liggins
- Jimmy Liggins
- Little Willie Littlefield
- Big Jay McNeely
- Jay McShann
- Amos Milburn
- Lucky Millinder
- Roy Milton
- Ella Mae Morse
- Elmore Nixon
- Johnny Otis
- Flip Phillips
- Sammy Price
- Louis Prima
- Red Prysock
- Ike Quebec
- Roomful of Blues
- Jimmy Rushing
- Sam Taylor
- The Treniers
- Big Joe Turner
- Titus Turner
- Eddie Vinson
- Cootie Williams
- Jimmy Witherspoon
- Mitch Woods
