= The Kirchin Band =

British band

- Also known as: the Ivor and Basil Kirchin Band
- Origin: Scotland
- Genres: Jazz, Latin, Beebop, Pop
- Years active: 1952 - 1957, 1958
- Labels: Parlophone, Decca, London
- Spinoffs: The New Kirchin Band, the Basil Kirchin Band

The Kirchin Band, later known as the Ivor and Basil Kirchin Band, was a British band that recorded for the Parlophone and Decca labels during the 1950s. It was led by both Ivor Kirchin and his son Basil Kirchin.

== Background ==
The beginnings of the band can be traced to when they were the resident band at Fountainbridge Palais in Edinburgh in September 1952. The band had eleven members. This included four trumpets, four saxes, piano, bass, and drums. The lineup then was George Bradley, Dennis Roberts, Trevor Lanigan, Frank Mowatt on trumpets, Geoff Taylor on alto sax, Johnny Marshall and John Xerri, both on tenor sax, Alex Leslie on bass, Harry South on piano, Don Percival on bass, Basil Kirchin on drums, and Ivor Kirchin, musical director, on vocals. They stayed there until November 1953 and then they became a resident band in Northern Ireland.

The group enjoyed popularity during the 1950s. They also toured with Sarah Vaughan and Billy Eckstine. According to Pop Matters, with the popularity of the percussive Latin-flavor that the band had evolved, Sarah Vaughan and Billy Eckstine wouldn't tour England unless the band was backing them.

Singers Rory Blackwell and Dean Webb sang with the band during the early parts of their careers.

== Career ==
Their singles, "Mambo Macoco" b/w "Tangerine" (Parlophone R. 3958), "Panambo" b/w "Tango Mambo" (Parlophone R.3968), and an EP, Minor Mambo", "Mother Goose Jumps" / "Mambo Nothing", "Lover Come Back to Me" (Decca DFE 6237), were reviewed by Mike Butcher in the Friday, January 21, 1955 issue of New Musical Express. Due to the space inhibition of the magazine, he couldn't give a review of all the songs. In his positive review, he did point out the quality of the recordings and the impact of the music. He also mentioned that trumpeter Bobby Pratt had guested on a couple of recordings but the lead trumpeter on the others was Murray Campbell.

On Friday, January 28, 1955, the band was appearing at the Trocadero Ballroom in Derby, on Saturday, they were at the Baths Hall in Manchester, then on Sunday at the Rialto in York, then on the following Thursday at the Regal Ballroom in Beverley.

In 1956, as The Ivor and Basil Kirchin Band, they released the Biggest Little Band in the World EP on Parlophone GEP 8569. It included the songs, "Rock-A-Beatin' Boogie", "Stone Age Mambo", "Down Under" and "Trumpet Blues and Cantabile".

Due to Ivor Kirchin wanting to pursue different things, the band broke up some time around June 1957. In the Melody Maker July 6, 1957 article, "Entertain or die, Says Basil Kirchin", Basil said that he and his father had discontinued the band because they couldn't see a future in big band jazz.

After the breakup there was apparently a new version of the band that performed at venues for a period of time. The New Kirchin Band played gigs on 14 September 1957, 23 November 1957, 22 February 1958, and 26 April 1958, the last three being billed as the Basil Kirchin Band.

== Later years ==
Their version of "Tweedlee Dee", originally released on Parlophone R 4010 in April 1955, appeared on the British Rock 'N' Roll - Volume Two compilation that was released on Reel To Reel RTRCD 049 in November 2018.

== The Basil Kirchin Band ==
The Basil Kirchin Band
- Origin: England
- Genres: Jazz
- Years active: 1957 - ?
- Labels: Parlophone
- Past members: Basil Kirchin

=== Background ===
The Basil Kirchin Band was a musical ensemble led by Basil Kirchin following the breakup of The Kirchin Band.

=== Career ===
Billed as The New Basil Kirchin Band, they appeared at the Savoy Ballroom on August 23, 1957. Now called The Basil Kirchin Band, they appeared with The Moonbeams at the Savoy Ballroom on December 20, 1957.

In February 1958, the Basil Kirchin Band with Rory Blackwell appeared at the Baths Hall in Streatham on a Friday and the Corn Exchange on a Saturday. It was reported by The Cash Box in its 29 March 1958 issue that The Basil Kirchin Band was to fly to the US on April 30 for a three-week tour of military bases.

Along with Marvin Rainwater, Johnny Duncan & the Bluegrass Boys, Phil Fernando and Dickie Dawson, The Basil Kirchin Band was booked to appear at the London Coliseum on Sunday, April 20, 1958.

Along with Lita Rosa, The Dallas Boys, Lonnie Donegan, Ken Mackintosh and his band, The Basil Kirchin band appeared on the televised Six-Five Special. The show, which was compered by Jim Dale, was broadcast on Saturday, 16 August.

With their successful tour in the US behind them, the Basil Kirchin band was playing at the Gaiety Theatre for the morning coffee dances at 10:45 and 7:30 evening dances. They also played a carnival and Wednesday evening late night carnival, and Sunday Variety Concerts with guests such as Walter Niblo and Peter Cavanagh.

=== Discography ===
Singles
| Act | Release | Catalogue | Year | Notes |
|---|---|---|---|---|
| The Basil Kirchin Band | "White Silver Sands" / "Waiting For The Robert E. Lee" | Parlophone A7962 | 1957 | |
| Basil Kirchin Band | "Rock-A-Conga" / "Skin Tight" | Parlophone R 4527 | 1959 | |
