= Basil Kirchin =

English musician (1927–2005)

- Born: Basil Philip Kirchinsky; 20 August 1927; Blackpool, Lancashire, England
- Died: 18 June 2005 (aged 77) Kingston upon Hull, Yorkshire, England
- Occupations: Drummer; composer; record producer; film scorer
- Years active: 1940–2005
- Musical career
- Genres: Avant-garde; big band; free jazz; experimental; ambient; electronic; musique concrète
- Instruments: Drums
- Labels: De Wolfe; KPM; AIR; Columbia; Island; Trunk

Basil Kirchin (born Basil Philip Kirchinsky; 20 August 1927 – 18 June 2005) was an English drummer and composer. His career spanned from playing drums in his father's big band at the age of 13, through scoring films, to electronic music featuring tape manipulation of the sounds of birds, animals, insects and children.

== Early life ==
He was born Basil Philip Kirchinsky, son of Lilian Kay Kirchin (Walters) and the bandleader Ivor Kirchin (Isaac Kirchinsky) in Blackpool, Lancashire, England. He debuted at the age of 13, playing drums with his father's big band orchestra at the Paramount, Tottenham Court Road in London. This was in the 1940s, during World War II; in the Blitz, Basil would play for eight hours every day and make his bed in the Warren Street Underground station while bombs exploded above him. After the war he left his father's band to play with the bands of Harry Roy, Teddy Foster, Jack Nathan and Ted Heath, but he returned to work with his father again in 1951. The Kirchin Band's early recordings for Parlophone were produced by George Martin. The band travelled with their own PA, which meant Basil was able to record the band's live performances live off the soundboard. By 1957, the rise of skiffle and rock and roll had brought an end to the big band era, and Kirchin decided it was time to move on "because you're a prisoner of rhythm. And I was fed up playing other people's music".

== Evolution ==
Kirchin traveled to India in search of spiritual fulfillment around 1957, and spent five months in the Ramakrishna Temple, close to the Ganges river, years before it was popular for musicians to do so, and he set out to learn about the world and see if his unique perspective and curiosity for life and the world were "more than just the ramblings of a pot-head". He then moved to Sydney in October 1959 with his wife Theresa, but as his possessions were being unloaded from the ship, a strap broke, and everything, including his recordings of the Kirchin band, were lost beneath the sea. This loss would trouble him for the rest of his life.

In 1961, Kirchin returned to Britain. His father Ivor had secured a residency at the newly opened Mecca Locarno club in Hull, and Basil spent his time between London and Hull. In Hull, he befriended local musician Keith Herd and began working on experimental pieces, "soundtracks for unmade films". In London he lived with songwriters Jimmy Jaques and Pat Ryan, and contributed heavily to the Johnny Keating album, The Keating Sound. He also produced material for the De Wolfe library using the talents of young session musicians such as Big Jim Sullivan, Jimmy Page and Tubby Hayes. In 1967, the Arts Council awarded him a grant to purchase a Nagra tape recorder. This he used to collect ambient sounds, animal noises at London Zoo and the voices of autistic children. The controversial recording of autistic children came about because of his wife who worked as a teacher at a special ed school in a little valley in Switzerland in the city of Shermat. This school was inhabited only by autistic children and their teachers and caregivers. He noticed from days when he picked his wife up from work that the children would communicate through musical phrases "I was fascinated by the sounds they make when they tried to communicate" "the melodies that they sing, no normal, with the greatest respect, human mind, could think of such intervals as they pitch and sing and the flood it comes out with and its emotional." Kirchin experimented with slowing down the recordings to reveal "Little boulders of sound". "It's gonna sound quite ridiculous but theres a certain corner in Zurich that when it rains and the rains come around this corner if you have the ability to do so you can slow it down to 834ths of a second its a whole symphony orchestra" "Take birdsong: all those harmonics you can't hear are brought down – sounds that human ears have never heard before". This he explained was the Worlds Within Worlds, and was a part of his quantum concept of time which he believed "there are several universes going on at the same time," "So, like a fly's world is completely different to our world, it moves at a completely different speed. And therefore if you speed up or slow down sound you can find a way into these parallel universes." Through his imaginary film scores, he was able to find work composing for horror and scifi films which helped to finance his experimentations with sounds were partly financed by composing film music for Catch Us If You Can (1965), The Shuttered Room (1967), The Strange Affair (1968), I Start Counting (1969) and The Abominable Dr. Phibes (1971). The use of his music in films exposed him to audiences, and his clipped up and distorted sounds did well at complementing the disturbing visual images within the horror and scifi genres.

His experimental pieces were released on two albums both called World Within Worlds. The first was issued in 1971: Worlds Within Worlds, EMI Columbia (SCX6463) and included Part I – Integration 2; Part II – The Human Element. The second was not issued until 1974: Worlds Within Worlds Island Records (HELP 18) Part III – Emergence; Part IV – Evolution. Personnel included free improvising musicians such as Evan Parker, Derek Bailey and Kenny Wheeler. Liner notes for the second release included laudatory comments from Brian Eno. Neither record sold more than a handful of copies, and it was not until much later that their pioneering techniques were recognised. Meanwhile, Kirchin became frustrated with the record companies meddling with his material, and went into seclusion. He continued to produce work in Hull, working with his friend Keith Herd and Hull-based musicians Dane Morrell, Danny Wood, Bernie Dolman and Roy Neave at Fairview Studios in Willerby, Hull.

Kirchin continued to compose throughout his life, and 30 years after their initial releases his music became acknowledged by a new generation with the release of material by Trunk Records. Kirchin said "I wanted to try and leave something for young people who are starting in music and looking for something as I've been looking all my life".

He spent the later years of his life living back in Hull in a modest terraced house with his beloved Swiss wife, Esther (née Muller), his early fame and eventful life not known in the ex-fishing community of Hessle Road, where he lived until his death in June 2005. Esther died in July 2007. Many musicians have since acknowledged the influence Kirchin had had on their own works, from Brian Eno and Nurse With Wound to Broadcast: "We need role models like Basil Kirchin to go forward, and, as we can see parallels in his music and ours, hearing this confirms that we're doing the right thing".

In early 2017, Hull-based production company Nova Studios Ltd worked with the Hull City of Culture 2017 team and Serious Music, to produce the documentary Mind On The Run, telling Kirchin's life story. There was also a weekend-long festival of Kirchin inspired music featuring The BBC Concert Orchestra led by Will Gregory, The Hidden Orchestra, Evan Parker, Alan Barnes, Bob Stanley, Sean O'Hagan, Tim Gane, Matthew Bourne and contributions from Jonny Trunk of Trunk Records, Jerry Dammers, Richard Williams and Matt Stephenson of Nova Studios.

== Works influenced ==
Kirchin's music influenced many musicians after him including Brian Eno and David Byrne. Brian Eno states "Basil realised long before the rest of us did that sound could become a malleable material", adding, "He was like a painter. That idea of music as painting was something that became very important to me. [...] When we [Eno and David Byrne] made My Life in the Bush of Ghosts, with the idea of using found voices as the centre of the piece rather than having them as an ornament, I'm sure the boldness and confidence I had for that partly came from Basil." Sean O'Hagan says Basil Kirchin's music "felt very real, very odd and slightly dangerous [...] It brought me to very odd areas - noisy experimental, totally unmusical forays but also very lyrical songs and some absolutely beautiful film music". Bob Stanley remembers listening to a track called "Mind on the Run" and described it as "terrific", "possibly something from The Avengers, like a chase scene or something, there's that really frenetic drumming and organ work. It's a great piece of music."

== Work with other artists ==
Rory Blackwell and Dean Webb were two singers that sang in Kirchin's band. Blackwell was the featured vocalist. Webb came on board as a result of going to see his friend Blackwell perform. Blackwell told Webb that he was leaving and a vacancy was created. Webb filled the requirement for a good singer and Basil Kirchin signed him up. Webb stayed with the band for a year then left, intending to pursue acting but in the end became a solo recording artist.

== Discography ==
=== Solo ===
- 1968 – States of Mind
- 1970 – Charcoal Sketches
- 1971 – Worlds Within Worlds: Part 1 – Integration/Part 2 – The Human Element
- 1973 – Worlds Within Worlds: Part 3 – Emergence/Part 4 – Evolution
- 2003 – Quantum: Part 1 – Once Upon a Time/Part 2 – Special Relativity (recorded circa 1970)
- 2005 – Abstractions of the Industrial North (a collection of library music for De Wolfe Music)
- 2007 – Particles
- 2018 – Deja Vu: Basil Kirchin at Fairview 1965 - 2005
- 2020 - Everyday Madness

=== In film ===
The whole Ivor and Basil Kirchin Band performed Jungle Fire Dance for a 1957, 2' 34" British Pathé short film. The film's identification number is 209.23.

2017 - The documentary Mind On The Run: The Basil Kirchin Story, featured the above Pathe footage and tells the story of Kirchin's life and work.

2022 - The horror film M3GAN featured Kirchin’s track “Silicon Chip” from an unreleased recording made at Fairview Studios, Hull in 1979.

=== Big Band ===
(see main article under Ivor Kirchin) 1964 - Johnny Keating and 27 Men - The Keating Sound (Kirchin credited as co-composer on the tracks "Listen", "Baghdad Blues", "Brave New World" and "Paris")

=== Soundtracks ===
- 1957 – Six-Five Special – season 1 episode 35 (TV series)
- 1958 – Six-Five Special – season 1 episode 78 (TV series)
- 1965 – Primitive London
- 1965 – The Dave Clark Five: Catch Us If You Can (called "Having A Wild Weekend" in the US) (uncredited)
- 1967 – The Shuttered Room
- 1968 – Assignment K
- 1968 – Negatives
- 1968 – The Strange Affair
- 1969 – I Start Counting
- 1969 – Journey to the Unknown – "The Madison Equation" (TV series)
- 1971 – The Abominable Dr. Phibes
- 1971 – Freelance
- 1974 – The Mutations
- 2023 - M3GAN (song "Silicon Chip", recorded in 1979 and released posthumously in 2017)

=== Library music ===
Kirchin released a number of Library Music albums with De Wolfe Music.

- 1966 - The Wild One
- 1966 - Abstractions of the Industrial North
- 1966 - Mind on the Run
- 1966 - Town Beat
- 1967 - Don't Lose Your Cool
- 1967 - The New Breed
