= I Got Loaded =

I Got Loaded may refer to:

- "I Got Loaded" (Peppermint Harris song), 1951
- "I Got Loaded" (Camille Bob song), a song by Camille Bob, 1965
