= One Mint Julep =

Single

Single by the Clovers
- B-side: "Middle Of The Night"
- Released: March 1952
- Recorded: December 19, 1951
- Studio: Atlantic Studios, New York City
- Genre: R&B
- Length: 2:27
- Label: Atlantic
- Songwriter: Rudy Toombs

The Clovers singles chronology
"Fool, Fool, Fool" (1951)	"One Mint Julep" (1952)	"Ting-A-Ling" (1952)

"One Mint Julep"

Single by Ray Charles

from the album Genius + Soul = Jazz
- B-side: "Let's Go"
- Released: February 1961
- Recorded: 1960
- Genre: Rhythm and blues
- Length: 3:02
- Label: Impulse!
- Songwriter: Rudy Toombs

Ray Charles singles chronology
"Them That Got" (1960)	"One Mint Julep" (1961)	"I've Got News for You" (1961)

"One Mint Julep" is a R&B song, written and composed by Rudy Toombs, that became a 1952 hit for the Clovers. The song has received over 100 cover versions, both with lyrics and as an instrumental.

== History ==
"One Mint Julep" was recorded on the Atlantic Records label in New York City on December 19, 1951, and released in March 1952. It was one of the first "drinking songs" to become a hit and one of the first to feature a tenor saxophone solo. It was an important step in the history of Ahmet Ertegun and Atlantic Records in its quest to become a hot rhythm and blues label. Stylistically, the Clovers were moving away from the sentimental lyrics of the romantic doo-wop group songs and adapting a cooler group style, emphasizing rhythm more, nearing the style of a jump blues combo.

Toombs had been hired by the Atlantic Records label to write and compose humorous up-tempo rhythm and blues novelty songs. Atlantic wanted material that was true to life, but also funny. The humor in this song comes in part from the idea of a young black man getting drunk on mint juleps, traditionally thought of as an aristocratic southern white woman's drink. The Atlantic B-side was "Middle of the Night" by "Nugetre", Ertegun spelled backwards.

The song appeared in the movie Saving Mr. Banks and in an episode of American sitcom, Will & Grace.

== Lyrics content ==
The story line is a classic one of a man who falls for the charms of a young woman only to realize a few years later that he has a ring on his finger. He remembers that it all started with "One Mint Julep."

== Drinking songs ==
"One Mint Julep" was the first of several successful up-tempo drinking songs by Toombs, who went on to write and compose "One Scotch, One Bourbon, One Beer" for Amos Milburn, "Fat Back and Corn Likker" for Louis Jordan, and "Nip Sip" for the Clovers.

== Cover versions ==
- In 1961 "One Mint Julep" finally reached a mass audience when Ray Charles's organ-and-big-band instrumental version reached No. 1 on the R&B charts, and also reached No. 8 on the pop chart.
- Jazz musician Bob James covered the song on his 1976 album Three.
