= Ivor Kirchin =

British band leader (1905–1997)

- Born: Isaac Kochinsky; 21 January 1905; London, England
- Died: 22 January 1997 (aged 92) Kingston upon Hull, Yorkshire, England
- Occupations: Bandleader; singer; drummer; conductor
- Years active: 1930–1967

Ivor Kirchin (born Isaac Kochinsky; 21 January 1905 – 22 January 1997) was a British band leader, and the father of noted composer Basil Kirchin (1927–2005).

== History ==
Born in London, Ivor Kirchin was the leader, singer, drummer, conductor and business manager for The Kirchin Band, a popular big band formed in the 1930s. The Kirchin Band performed on the Mecca ballroom circuit during the Second World War. There was always plenty of work around the dance hall circuit for the band but there were few recordings until 1954, when George Martin of EMI spotted the talent and arranged a recording date. The band billed themselves as 'The Biggest Little Band in the World' because their arrangements made them sound like a larger band than they were: four trumpets, four saxophones, piano, bass and drums. From the time he was 14 Ivor's son Basil took over the drum stool, and was often featured as a soloist. The band played fast and loud, with a varied repertoire that included standards, mambos and straight-ahead jazz.

In 1946 Basil left to work with Harry Roy, Teddy Foster, Jack Nathan and Ted Heath, while Ivor's band continued to play the Mecca circuit. In 1951 Basil returned to The Kirchin Band, now renamed the Ivor and Basil Kirchin Band, which made its debut on 8 September with a year-long residency at the Edinburgh Fountainbridge Palais, followed in November 1953 by an engagement at the Belfast Plaza Ballroom that extended into the spring of 1954. At the same time, the group also backed singer Ruby Murray during a 13-week series for Radio Luxembourg. They returned to London in 1954 for a summer residency and an appearance at the 1954 Jazz Jamboree. Unfortunately at this time a serious car accident sidelined Ivor, requiring Basil to take over band leadership and business management for the band, which he soon realized he enjoyed much less than the music. With his father's return to health, the band took on a brassier, more spontaneous sound which proved immensely popular. It was at this time that the band came to the attention of a young 28-year-old engineer for Parlophone Records named George Martin, who proceeded to launch a whole new recording career for the band. The band continued to enjoy success, with Billy Eckstein and Sarah Vaughan insisting that the Kirchin Band backed them when they toured Britain. Their shows would break attendance records and were featured in Melody Maker polls. By 1955 the band was now recognised as a swing/jazz type band and they were on a Swing Session broadcast on the BBC Light Programme. The show was shared with others and the Kirchin Band played three arrangements by Jimmy Deuchar: "Flying Hickory," "Lester Leaps In" and "Swing Session" and a vocal from Johnny Grant.

In December, 1957, Dean Webb joined the band as its vocalist, replacing Rory Blackwell who was leaving to pursue a solo career. Blackwell had said that Webb was a good beat singer which got him in. Webb stayed with the ensemble for a year and then later in 1959 went solo, recording for the Parlophone label.

At the close of the decade music trends began to move away from big bands toward smaller jazz combos, and soon rock & roll appeared. The Kirchin Band made some attempts to stay relevant with novelty cha-cha and rock and roll numbers, but the end was clearly in sight. By 1967, Ivor Kirchin retired the band, and his son Basil went on to other musical pursuits.

By the early 1980s, Kirchin settled in Kingston upon Hull, East Riding of Yorkshire, near to his son. He died there in 1997, aged 92.

== Discography ==
=== Singles and EPs ===
- 1938 - "The Chestnut Tree" (Rex 9434)
- 1939 - "The Park Parade" (Rex 9501)
- 1939 - "The Handsome Territorial" (Rex 9567)
- 1939 - "Knees Up Mother Brown" (Rex 9694)
- 1954 - "Meet The Kirchins" - The Kirchin Band (7"EP) (Decca DFE 6237)
- 1954 - "Mambo Macoco" / "Tangerine" - The Kirchin Band (Parlophone MSP 6144)
- 1954 - "Mambo Nothing" / "Minor Mambo" / "Lover Come Back To Me" / "Mother Goose Jumps" - The Kirchin Band (Decca F 10434)
- 1954 - "Tango Mambo" / "Panambo" - The Kirchin Band (Parlophone R-3968)
- 1955 - "Lester Leaps The Mambo" / "Lanigiro" - The Kirchin Band (Ivor and Basil) (Parlophone R-3985 GEP 8522)
- 1955 - "Bandbox" / "Tweedle Dee" / "(Oh, Baby) Beedleumbo" / "Mambo Rock" - The Kirchin Band (Ivor and Basil) (Parlophone R-4018 GEP 8531)
- 1955 - "Two Hearts, Two Kisses" / "Dance With Me Henry" - Jean Campbell with The Kirchin Band (Parlophone R-4026)
- 1955 - "Gotta Be This or That" / "The Great Lie" / "Flying Hickory" / "Comb and Paper Blues" - The Kirchin Band (Parlophone R-4039)
- 1956 - "Rock-A-Beatin' Boogie" / "Stone Age Mambo" - The Ivor and Basil Kirchin Band (Parlophone R-4140)
- 1956 - "Rock-A-Beatin' Boogie" / "Stone Age Mambo" / "Down Under" / "Trumpet Blues and Cantabile" (Parlophone GEP8569)
- 1956 - "Sing, Sing, Sing" / "Big City Blues" / "Lover Man" / "Big Deal" / "Pour Quoi" / "Taboo" - The Kirchin Band (Parlophone R-4192)
- 1956 - "The Roller" / "St. Louis Blues" - The Ivor and Basil Kirchin Band (Parlophone R-4222)
- 1956 - "Ambush" / "Rockin' and Rollin' Through The Darktown Strutters' Ball" - The Ivor and Basil Kirchin Band (Parlophone R-4237)
- 1957 - "Rock Around The World" / "Rock Around The World" - The Ivor and Basil Kirchin Band (Parlophone R-4266)
- 1957 - "Jungle Fire Dance" / "Calypso!!" - The Ivor and Basil Kirchin Band (Parlophone R-4284)
- 1957 - "The High Life" / "Blues and Happy Times" - The Ivor and Basil Kirchin Band (Parlophone R-4302)
- 1957 - "Teenage World" / "So Rare" - The Kirchin Band and The Bandits (Parlophone R-4335)
- 1957 - "White Silver Sands" / "Waiting for the Robert E. Lee" - The Basil Kirchin Band (Parlophone R-4344)
- 1958 - "Cha Cha Bells" / "Oh Dear What Can The Cha Cha Be" - Basil Kirchin's Rock-A-Cha Cha Band (Parlophone R-4511)
- 1959 - "Rock-A-Conga" / "Skin Tight" - The Basil Kirchin Band (Parlophone R-4527)
- 1960 - "Caravan" / "Night and Day" - Johnny Byrell with Basil Kirchin's Big 7 (Rex RS-020)

=== Albums ===
- 2010 - Gotta Be This or That: The EMI Singles Compilation 1954-56 - The Kirchin Band

== Personnel ==
Murray Campbell, Frank Donlan, Stan Palmer, Norman Baron, Bobby Pratt (tp), Brian Haden (as), Norman Hunt, John Xerri, (ts), George Robinson (bs), Johnny Patrick (p), Ronnie Seabrook (b), Basil Kirchin (d), Johnny Grant (vcl), Ivor Kirchin (dir).

- Tracks: "Mambo Nothing" / "Minor Mambo" / "Lover Come Back To Me" (vcl Johnny Grant) / "Mother Goose Jumps" (vcl Johnny Grant).

Trevor Lanigan, Frank Donlan, Norman Baron, George Bradley (tp), Brian Haden (as), Alan Rowe, Harry Perry (ts), George Robinson (bs), Johnny Patrick (p), Ashley Kozak (b), Basil Kirchin (d), Johnny Grant (vcl), Ivor Kirchin (dir).

- Tracks: "Trumpet Blues And Cantabile" / "Stoneage Mambo"

== Personnel change ==
- On December 22., 1955, the Kirchins recorded 'Rock A Beatin' Boogie', and, 'Down Under', released on (Parlophone R4140). Keith Barr replaced Alan Rowe on tenor saxophone, with Clyde Ray on vocal.

== In film ==
- The whole band performed "Jungle Fire Dance" for a 1957, 2' 34" British Pathé short film. The film's identification number is 209.23.

The Ivor Kirchen Band featured in the film, Spring In Park Lane 1948, at the Lyceum Dance Hall London scene playing The Sheik Of Araby. Danced to by Anna Negal and Michael Wielding.
