= Leroy Dallas =

American singer

- Born: December 24, 1909; Mobile, Alabama, United States
- Died: September 1, 1967 (aged 57) Brooklyn, New York, United States
- Genre: Blues
- Occupations: Guitarist, singer, washboard player, songwriter
- Instruments: Guitar, vocals, washboard
- Years active: 1930s–1962
- Labels: Sittin' in With, Jade Records

Leroy Dallas (December 24, 1909 – September, 1967) was an American blues guitarist, singer and songwriter. Amongst his more notable numbers were "Good Morning Blues" and "Jump Little Children, Jump" (both 1948). He performed with Brownie McGhee and with Frank Edwards and recorded eight tracks in his own name between 1948 and 1962.

== Life and career ==
Dallas was born in Mobile, Alabama, in 1909 and relocated to Memphis, Tennessee, in 1924. He travelled widely in the Deep South in the 1930s and 1940s. Around 1937, in Knoxville, Tennessee, he played the washboard accompanying Brownie McGhee. Dallas teamed up with Frank Edwards and Georgia Slim for a while, and he also played solo on the streets of Chicago. In his itinerant early years, he formed a small band with James McMillan, who taught Dallas to play the guitar, and they performed in juke joints around the Mississippi Delta. Around 1940, he and Edwards performed on the radio program Major Bowes Amateur Hour. Dallas settled in Brooklyn, New York, in 1943, where he worked as a food server, stevedore, truck driver, and porter.

By 1946, Brownie McGhee had become a sought-after session guitarist in New York, backing Dallas, Big Chief Ellis, Stick McGhee, Champion Jack Dupree, and Bob Gaddy. Through these connections, McGhee arranged for Dallas to record some of his own material for Bob Shad's Sittin' in With label. At the first of these sessions in October 1948, Dallas recorded a version of the song originally known as "Good Morning, School Girl"; Dallas's version was entitled "Good Morning Blues". It was released as a single, backed with "I'm Going Away", by Sittin' in With Records. He also recorded two other tracks, "I'm Down Now, but I Won't Be Down Always" and "Jump Little Children, Jump", which were released as singles. On these New York recordings, Dallas sang and played the guitar, backed by McGhee on guitar, Wilbert Ellis on piano, and (probably) Gene Ramey on double bass. AllMusic noted that Dallas exhibited "little sign of urbanization (indeed his springy guitar rhythms positively countrify 'Jump Little Children, Jump'...)". In September 1949, Dallas recorded two more songs, "Your Sweet Man's Blues" and "Baby Please Don't Go Back to New Orleans", released by Sitting' in With and, under licence, by Jade Records (Jade 707).

Dallas was noted as a "capable guitarist" and "expressive singer", but it was not until January 1962 that the blues historian Pete Welding arranged for him to record two more tracks, "Sweet Man Blues" and "She Caught the M&O." These were his final recordings. He retired from the music industry later the same year. The last two songs he recorded, which were not released at the time, are included on the compilation album Ramblin' on My Mind (1965).

Dallas died in September 1967 in Brooklyn, New York.

His recordings have been issued on several blues compilation albums, including his "Your Sweet Man's Blues" on Blues Roots Vol. 2 : Blues All Around My Bed (1983). In 1994, all eight of his recorded songs were included on the Ralph Willis' compilation album Ralph Willis: Complete Recordings Vol. 2 (1950–1953), issued by Document Records.

The American indie rock band Jump, Little Children, took its name from the Dallas song, which in itself was covered by Sonny Terry and Brownie McGhee.

== Discography ==
=== Singles ===
Year	Title	Record label
1948	"I'm Down Now, but I Won't Be Down Always" / "Jump Little Children, Jump"	Sittin' in With 522
1948	"Good Morning Blues" / "I'm Going Away"	Sittin' in With 526
1949	"Your Sweet Man's Blues" / " Baby Please Don't Go Back to New Orleans"	Sittin in With 537 and reissued on Jade 707

=== Compilation album ===
Year	Title	Record label
1994	Ralph Willis: Complete Recordings Vol. 2 (1950-1953)	Document Records
