= Elmore Nixon =

- Born: November 17, 1933; Crowley, Louisiana, U.S.
- Died: June 1975 (aged 41) Houston, Texas, U.S.
- Genres: Jump blues
- Occupation(s): Pianist, singer
- Instrument(s): Piano, vocals
- Years active: 1947–1969
- Labels: Gold Star; Peacock; Sittin' in With; Savoy; Mercury; Post; Imperial; Arhoolie; Jewel Records

Elmore Nixon (November 17, 1933 – June 1975) was an American jump blues pianist and singer. His piano playing accompanied several artists on their recordings, including Peppermint Harris, Clifton Chenier and Lightnin' Hopkins, as well as releasing a number of singles under his own name. Details of his life outside of his recording career are sketchy.

== Biography ==
He was born in Crowley, Louisiana, United States. Little is known of his early life, although in 1939 his family relocated to Houston, Texas, where he grew up. He remained in Houston for the rest of his life. It is presumed that he learned to play the piano whilst undergoing training to join the church.

In October 1947, at the age of 13, Nixon supplied piano accompaniment to Peppermint Nelson's recording of "Peppermith Boogie" for Gold Star Records. It was the commencement of an almost decade long, continuous career, in the recording studio for Nixon, working with a number of record labels. He became a de facto member of Henry Hayes' Four Kings, who were also credited as Henry Hayes Orchestra and Henry Hayes Band. Apart from Hayes and Nixon, the ensemble regularly included Carl Campbell, Milton Willis, L.C. Williams, Hubert Robinson, Ivory Lee and Hop Wilson. Nixon played predominately in a jump blues style.

Nixon's debut single release, "Foolish Love", was recorded in 1949 for the Sittin' in With record label. Further single releases occurred over the next six years for labels including Peacock, Mercury, Savoy, and Post. His only commercial success came with the self-penned "Alabama Blues", which was later recorded by other musicians. Studio session work over the same period saw Nixon play piano accompaniment to Lester Williams, Hop Wilson, Billy Bizor and Clarence "Gatemouth" Brown.

During the mid-1960s, Nixon recorded with Clifton Chenier, on the latter's sessions for Arhoolie Records. He also supplied piano backing for Lightnin' Hopkins, when Hopkins recorded sides with Jewel Records. Apart from recording work, Nixon toured with his own band, performing largely in Texas and Louisiana. Also in the 1960s, Nixon enjoyed performing before Mexican audiences, making frequent trips across the border.

Nixon underwent major surgery in 1970, which curtailed his activities and was in poor health until he died in June 1975, in Houston, Texas, U.S. at the age of 41.

== Selected discography ==
=== Singles ===
Year	A-side	B-side	Record label	Credited to
1949	"Foolish Love"	"It's A Sad Sad World"	Sittin' in With	Elmore Nix and his Hadacol Boys
1950	"Searching Blues"	"I'm Moving Out"	Sittin' in With	Elmore Nixon
1950	"Alabama Blues"	"Sad and Blue"	Peacock Records	Elmore Nixon
1951	"You See Me Smiling"	"A Hepcat's Advice"	Peacock Records	Elmore Nixon
1952	"Playboy Blues"	"Million Dollar Blues"	Mercury Records	Elmore Nixon
1953	"Elmore's Blues"	"Sad and Blue"	Savoy Records	Elmore Nixon with Henry Hayes Orchestra
1953	"Forgive Me Baby"	"Over Here Pretty Baby"	Savoy Records	Henry Hayes Orchestra With Elmore Nixon
1953	"Last Nite"	"If You'll Be My Love"	Savoy Records	Henry Hayes Orchestra With Elmore Nixon
1955	"Don't Do It"	"The Women"	Post Records	Elmore Nixon
1955	"A Broken Heart"	"You Left Me"	Post Records	Elmore Nixon

=== Compilation albums ===
Year	Title	Record label	Credited to
1985	Shout & Rock	Sundown Records	Peppermint Harris & Elmore Nixon

== See also ==
- List of blues musicians
- List of jump blues musicians
