= Rock You Sinners =

1957 British film by Denis Kavanagh

- Opening titles
- Directed by: Denis Kavanagh
- Story by: Beatrice Scott
- Produced by: B.C. Fancey
- Starring: Philip Gilbert; Adrienne Scott; Colin Croft; Jackie Collins
- Production companies: E.J. Fancey Productions; Small Film Distributors
- Distributed by: Small Film Distributors
- Release date: 1957
- Running time: 59 minutes
- Country: United Kingdom
- Language: English

Rock You Sinners is a 1957 British second feature black and white musical film directed by Denis Kavanagh and featuring early British rock and roll artistes, including Art Baxter and His Rock 'n' Roll Sinners, known for their song "Rock You Sinners". The story was by Beatrice Scott.

According to the British Film Institute it was the "first British rock 'n' roll film".

== Plot ==
The success of his rock and roll television show brings fame for DJ Johnny Laurence but trouble for his relationship with steady girlfriend Carol.

== Cast ==
- Philip Gilbert as Johnny Laurence
- Adrienne Scott as Carol Carter
- Colin Croft as Pete
- Jackie Collins as Jackie
- Michael Duffield as Paul Selway
- Beckett Bould as McIver
- Tony Hall as himself (compère)
- Tony Crombie as himself: leader, Tony Crombie and His Rockers
- Art Baxter as himself: leader, Art Baxter and His Rockin' Sinners
- Joan Small as herself
- Dickie Bennett as himself
- Don Sollash as himself: leader, Don Sollash and His Rockin' Horses
- Rory Blackwell as himself: leader, Rory Blackwell and the Blackjacks
- George "Calypso" Browne as himself (as George Browne)
- Curly Pat Barry as himself
- Angus the dog as himself

== Production ==
The film is set in London and is mainly set in clubs, cafes and small recording studios.

== Critical reception ==
The Monthly Film Bulletin wrote: "The plot of this film is negligible, most of the footage being occupied with rock 'n' roll numbers which, however lively, can hardly satisfy the more exacting initiates of the style."

Kine Weekly wrote: "Good British title programmer for the masses and teenagers. ... Unpretentious as it is the film clearly proves that the Americans have no monopoly of rock 'n' roll fare."

Picture Show wrote: "One of the few British rock 'n' roll musicals to be made ... well-acted by Philip Gilbert as the disc jockey and Adrienne Scott as his girl-friend."

Picturegoer wrote: "If rock 'n roll is really dying – as everyone says it is – this film should stand as a tombstone. For by its monumental ineptitude it finally closes the lid on whatever was fresh and exciting in the harsh, twitching beat. Rock 'n roll addicts can view it as a dismal British failure to attempt a screen treatment of their kind of music. Others? There's a lot of unintentional humour – even if it seems like laughing at a wake. The acting is so wooden you could light a fire with it. And the story is so wet it would douse it. ... The British rock 'n roll bands emerge as pallid imitations of the Americans. The musicians get terribly worked up, but picturegoers won't – except perhaps at the sight of the lumpily decorative Jackie Collins. The best things in the film? The credit titles which are presented with some originality – and the final bit... you know: The End."

In British Sound Films: The Studio Years 1928–1959 David Quinlan rated the film as "poor", writing: "Monumentally inept British rock 'n' roll offering."
