= Calvin Boze =

American trumpeter and bandleader

Calvin B. Boze, Sr. (October 15, 1916 – June 18, 1970) was an American trumpeter and bandleader, best known for his recordings at the turn of the 1950s.

== Biography ==
Born in Trinity County, Texas, Boze began playing in a high school band, which also featured Illinois Jacquet, Arnett Cobb, and singer Charles Brown. He went on to play in the bands of Marvin Johnson and then Milton Larkins, again with Jacquet and also Eddie Vinson.

After wartime service, he settled in Los Angeles and, as singer and trumpet player, took part in the development of the jump blues style, heavily influenced by Louis Jordan. Boze first recorded in 1945, but his biggest successes came with Aladdin Records after 1949. In May 1950, he released "Safronia B", a classic if unsophisticated recording which, with its refrain of "I surrender! I surrender!", epitomised the sense of fun in the West Coast music scene just before the dawn of rock and roll. It made No. 9 on the Billboard R&B chart in June 1950, and has since been included on several anthologies of the period. The song was later recorded by The Manhattan Transfer.

He toured widely around this time, particularly with Dinah Washington. However, his later recordings, including "Looped" and an early version of "Lawdy Miss Clawdy", were less successful, and he did not record after 1952. He continued to play at jam sessions around Los Angeles, while also developing a career as a social worker and school teacher, before his death, aged 53, after prolonged ill health.

He died in Los Angeles, California in June 1970.

== Selected discography ==
- If You Ever Had The Blues (1945-1952) (Jasmine JASMCD-3239, 2022) note: everything Boze recorded is included in this CD.

== See also ==
- List of jump blues musicians
