= Piney Brown =

American singer

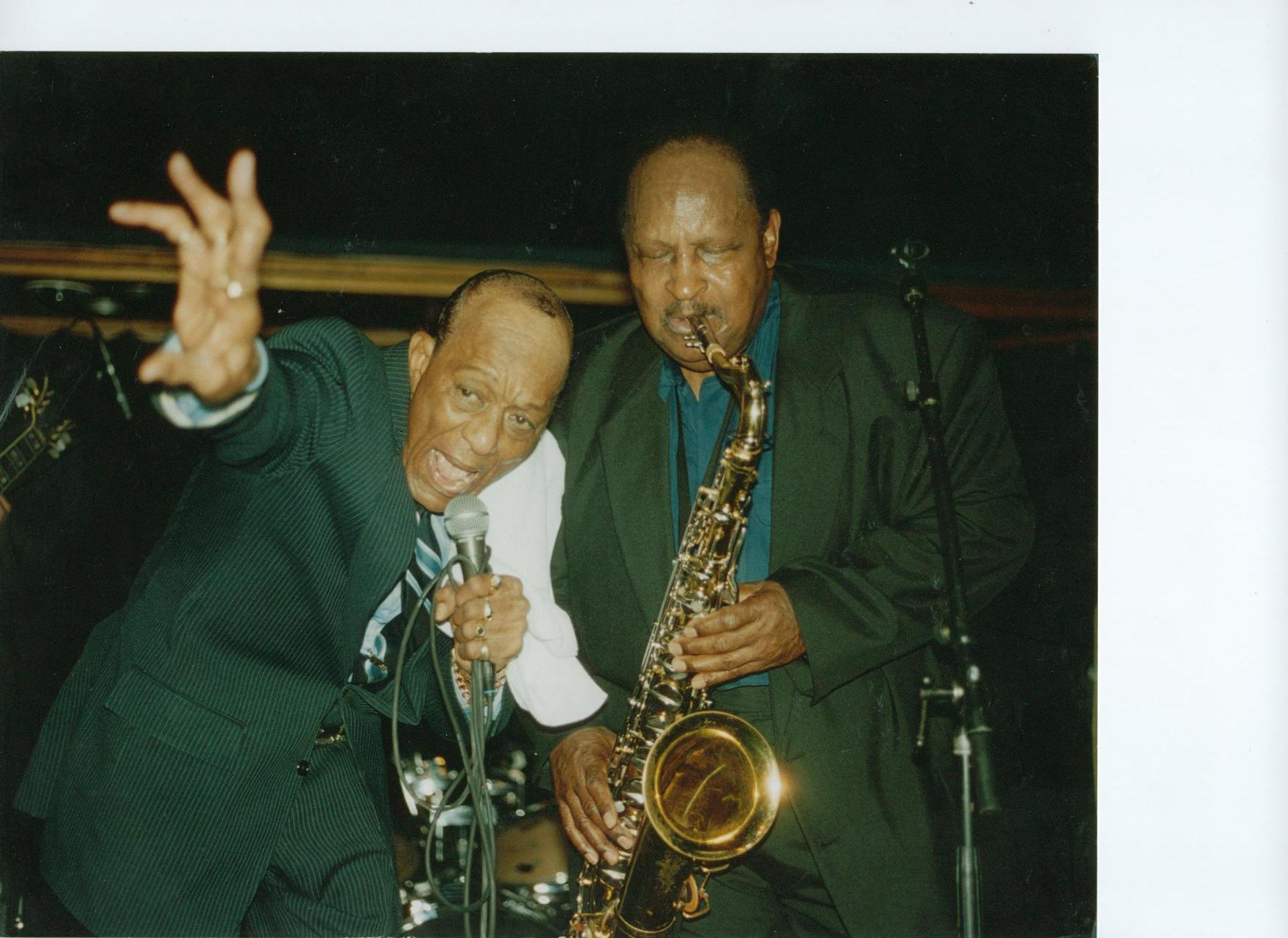
- Brown (left) reunited with Ed Wiley Jr., after nearly 50 years, at the Blues Estafette in Utrecht, Netherlands, 2000

Background information
- Born: Columbus S. Perry; January 20, 1922; Birmingham, Alabama, United States
- Died: February 5, 2009 (aged 87) Dayton, Ohio, United States
- Genres: R&B, blues
- Occupations: Singer, songwriter
- Instrument: Vocals
- Labels: Apollo Records, King Records, Jubilee Records, Sound Stage 7, among others

Columbus S. Perry (January 20, 1922 – February 5, 2009), better known as Piney Brown, was an American R&B and blues singer and songwriter, who has been described as a "fine, big-voiced shouter". He released a string of singles between 1948 and 1988 and issued two albums late in his career. His songs have been recorded by Little Milton and James Brown.

== Life and career ==
Perry was born in Birmingham, Alabama, and raised in Kansas City, Missouri, and joined his family's gospel singing group. He relocated to Baltimore in 1940 and made his recording debut as Piney Brown for Miracle Records in 1947. Of the four songs that were recorded, only one was released, "That's Right, Little Girl", issued by Esquire Records in the UK several years later. Perry took the stage name Piney Brown from a club owner in Kansas City in the 1930s, who was immortalized in Big Joe Turner's "Piney Brown Blues" (1940).

An item in the Chicago Defender on February 7, 1948, reported that Brown was beginning a package tour the next month. His tenure with Miracle was short-lived, and he moved the same year to Apollo Records in New York City, cutting several sides in 1948, including the single "Morning Blues" backed with "Gloomy Monday Blues". He next recorded for Sittin' In With Records, at which he met his long-time friend Ed Wiley Jr. They worked together for the first time in 1952, on the single "Have Mercy" backed with "Kokimo" (1952). Short-term, largely fruitless, stints followed with Par (1952) and Atlas Records (1954).

In 1953 Brown recorded "Ooh You Bring Out the Wolf in Me" backed with "Don't Pass My By" for Jubilee Records and "Walk-a-Block-and-Fall" backed with "Whispering Blue" for King Records. None of his records made the national charts, but they sold well locally, and Brown was a top-performing attraction who regularly toured the country. He performed with the young guitarist Albert Collins in the early 1950s. In the music polls in the Pittsburgh Courier, Brown was regularly nominated as the "top blues artist". He performed as a duo with Billy Brooks, and they played for a time at the Club DeLisa in Chicago, as a result of which both of them recording for Duke Records. In 1959, Brown recorded "Sugar in My Tea (Cream in My Coffee)" backed with "My Love" for Mad Records, a label founded by Tommy "Madman" Jones two years earlier.

In the early 1960s, Brown returned to Birmingham to look after his mother, although he continued to tour more locally. By 1969, he signed a contract with Sound Stage 7 and released a couple of singles, including "One of These Days (You're Gonna Want Me)" backed with "Nashville Wimmin" (1970). Brown co-wrote the song "Popcorn" with James Brown. He performed on package tours with Ted Taylor, Chuck Berry, and Bo Diddley.

In 2000, after 48 years apart musically, Brown and Wiley reunited to perform at the Blues Estafette, in Utrecht, Netherlands. Brown's debut album, My Task, was issued in 2004. His last album, One of These Days, was issued by Bonedog Records, of McKeesport, Pennsylvania, in 2006. Brown supported its release by playing some local gigs.

Brown died on February 5, 2009, at the age of 87, in Dayton, Ohio, his home since 1963.

== Ambiguities of songwriting credits and naming ==
Songwriting credits for Rosco Gordon's "Just a Little Bit" sometimes include Brown, but the authorship is unclear. In 1959, Little Walter recorded "Me and Piney Brown" on Checker Records No. 938.

He is not to be confused with the Piney Brown who was the manager of the Sunset nightclub in Kansas City in the 1930s. Big Joe Turner wrote "Piney Brown Blues" in that man's honor and sang it throughout his career.

== Discography ==
=== Albums ===
Year	Title	Record label
2004	My Task	Bonedog Records
2006	One of These Days	Bonedog Records

=== Selected singles ===
Year	Title	Label
1948	"Morning Blues" / "Gloomy Monday Blues"	Apollo Records
1950	"Why Do I Cry over You?" / "That's Right, Baby"	Apollo Records
1951	"How About Rockin' with Me" / "Lovin' Gal Blues"	Apollo Records
1952	"Have Mercy" / "Kokimo"	Sittin' In With Records
1953	"Walk-a-Block-and-Fall" / "Whispering Blues"	King Records
1953	"Ooh You Bring Out the Wolf in Me" / "Don't Pass My By"	Jubilee Records
1959	"Sugar in My Tea (Cream in My Coffee)" / "My Love"	Mad Records
1962	"Unemployed" / "After There’s Love"	Cimarron Records
1969	"Everything but You" / "(I'm Tired of) Running"	Deep Groove Records
1969	"Bring It On Home" / "Baby, Don't Do It"	Sound Stage 7
1970	"One of These Days (You're Gonna Want Me)" / "Nashville Wimmin"	Sound Stage 7
1988	"Two Lips in the Dark" / "Ain't It a Shame"	D-JKN

== Other sources ==
- Baumgartner, Brian. "Unheralded Legend of R&B and Still Singing the Blues: Piney Brown". Juke Blues, vol. 48, pp. 28–37.
