= Roosevelt Wardell =

American pianist, singer, and composer

- Born: 1933
- Died: April 29, 1999 (aged 65–66) Smyrna, Delaware, U.S.
- Genres: Jazz, rhythm and blues
- Occupations: Musician, composer
- Instruments: Piano, vocals
- Years active: Late 1940s–mid-1960s
- Labels: Riverside

Roosevelt Wardell (1933 – April 29, 1999) was an American jazz and rhythm and blues pianist, singer, and composer.

== Life and career ==
Wardell was co-leader for two singles – "So Glad I'm Free" and "Deep Moanin' Blues" – that were recorded with Ed Wiley for Atlantic Records and released in 1952. In November of the same year, Wardell was pianist for recordings led by vocalist Johnny O'Neal and by guitarist Earl Hooker; these were released by King Records. Variations on this small group played in the Florida area at around the same time. Wardell recorded again early in 1953, with Wiley and his orchestra. Wardell was in the army for part of the 1950s.

Wardell's only album as leader was The Revelation, for Riverside Records in October 1960. The session was arranged for him by saxophonist and A&R man Cannonball Adderley, who had heard him playing. This was a trio recording, with Sam Jones on bass and Louis Hayes on drums, and featured standards and three originals from Wardell.

Wardell's final recordings were two tracks in 1963, for a band led by Earl Anderza. Wardell died in Smyrna, Delaware on April 29, 1999.

== Playing style ==
Billboard magazine commented on Wardell's "lightning-fast rippling run technique, with occasional passages of full, rich block chords" on his album.

== Influence ==
Pianist Horace Tapscott listed Wardell as one of the musicians who had influenced him.
