= Bill Harris (guitarist) =

American R&B and jazz guitarist (1925–1988)

Bill Harris (April 14, 1925 – December 6, 1988) was an American guitarist who played R&B and jazz. He was born in Nashville, North Carolina and died in Washington, D.C.

Harris studied guitar in Washington, D.C. at the Washington Junior College of Music and in 1950 began playing with the R&B vocal group The Clovers. He remained with the group through 1958, playing on many of their most successful hit records. During this time he also recorded as a jazz musician, including albums for EmArcy Records in 1956–1957. He played in the D.C. area through the 1960s and 70s and also taught music, publishing several books on guitar technique. He was awarded a compositional fellowship from the National Endowment for the Arts in 1972; for much of 1972–1973 Harris played in France. After returning to the U.S., Harris began managing his jazz club Pigfoot in D.C., but the club was repossessed by the Internal Revenue Service in 1981 to collect back taxes. Harris worked as an impresario late in life, organizing and presenting concerts in multiple genres.

== Discography ==
- Bill Harris (EmArcy, 1956)
- The Harris Touch (EmArcy, 1957)
- Great Guitar Sounds (Mercury/Wing, 1963)
- Caught in the Act (Jazz Guitar, 1966)
- Down in the Alley (Black & Blue, 1973)
- Rhythm (Black & Blue, 1973)
- Bill Harris in Paris Live! Alone! (Jazz Guitar, 1974)
