= Hey, Miss Fannie =

1952 song

"Hey Miss Fannie" was a 1952 single for the R&B group the Clovers. It became a hit for them that year. It has been covered by several other artists over the years.

== History ==
"Hey Miss Fanny" was written by Ahmet Ertegün. In addition to the version by The Clovers, a demo was recorded by The Teen Kings, a group that included Roy Orbison in their line up. They were looking for a contract and went to studio to audition for the Columbia label. Two tracks were recorded at the session, one was "Hey, Miss Fannie" and the other was "Ooby Dooby".

Tommy Sands recorded a version which appeared on his 1959 Sands Storm! album which was released on Capitol T1081.

Dean Webb also recorded a version that was released in 1959. It was the B side of his solo debut, "Warm Your Heart", which was released on Parlophone 45- R4549. In spite of the R&B genre that this song originated from, Webb managed to get his voice and the musical content to come together to produce the right result. According to the Record Collector magazine in 2013, his version was "a near-perfect example of British rock’n’roll at the tail end of the era".

== Clovers version ==
"Hey, Miss Fannie"

Single by The Clovers
- A-side: "Hey, Miss Fannie"
- B-side: "I Played the Fool"
- Released: October 1952
- Length: 2:23
- Label: Atlantic 45-977
- Composer: Nugetre

The Clovers singles chronology
"Ting-A-Ling" (1952)	"Hey, Miss Fannie" (1952)	"Crawlin'" (1953)

=== Background ===
"Hey, Miss Fannie" backed with "I Played the Fool" was issued on Atlantic 45–977 in October, 1952. It would be an R&B Top Ten hit.

There was a mention of the song in The Cash Box Rhythm & Blues Ramblings column of October 11. It said. " If past history is any indication, you’ll soon be hearing “Hey Miss Fannie” and “I Played The Fool”, over and over again." Along with "If Be Satisfied" by Billy Ward and His Dominos, "Hey Miss Fannie" was The Cash Box Award O' the Week record. The review of the record said that it was a fast beat rocker and a two-sided release that was a natural follow up to their “Ting-A-Ling” single.

=== Chart ===
The October 18 issue of The Cash Box reported that the single was at no. 6 on the Hot chart in Dallas. The October 25 issue of The Cash Box reported that it was at no. 7 on the Hot chart in Atlanta. The Following week (1 November) it was at no. 6 in Atlanta and No. 10 in Memphis. On 8 November, it was at no. 9 in both Philadelphia and Memphis. The following week, it was at no. 4 in Fort Worth and no. 7 in Memphis. It was also at no. 10 in Los Angeles and no. 5 in St. Louis and no. 9 in Shoals Ind.

The song would eventually be recorded by Cash Box as a no. 1 in Philadelphia. It would chart nationally on the Billboard R&B chart, peaking at no. 2. The B side, "I Played the Fool" would also made the charts, peaking at no. 3.
