= Dean Webb =

English singer (born 1940)

- Also known as: Dean Webb
- Born: Michael Eaton; 1940 (age 85–86); Portsmouth, England, UK
- Genres: Rock and roll
- Occupations: Singer; actor; composer
- Instrument: Voice
- Years active: 1950s – 1960s
- Formerly of: The Kirchin Band

Dean Webb (born Michael Eaton; 1940) is an English rock and roll singer, actor, and composer.

== Background ==
Webb was born in Portsmouth as Michael Eaton. A short time later the family moved to Reading. He was educated at St. Anne's Roman Catholic School in Caversham. Eaton chose the name "Dean Webb" as his stage name; the name "Dean" likely came from James Dean and "Webb" came from "Harry Webb", the real name of singer Cliff Richard.

When Webb was twelve, he joined a boys military band. While there he played a few instruments.

Before he was a professional singer, he worked as an apprentice blacksmith in Reading town centre. Webb released a few singles between 1959-1960, but none of them charted.

According to the Record Collector magazine, Webb was a "two-shot-wonder who missed both times" and theorises that weak and unenthusiastic promotion may have been the reason. The magazine also went on to say that his cover of "Hey Miss Fannie" was a near-perfect example of British rock 'n' roll at the tail end of the era.

He was also a member of The Kirchin Band.

Under his real name, he was the musical composer for the 1970 film The Wife Swappers.

== Music career ==
=== 1950s ===
Not being satisfied with his career as a blacksmith, Webb entered a competition that bandleader Eric Winstone had organised. He won the competition. After that Webb formed a rock band with local musicians and they gigged around the clubs and dances in the Reading area.

Webb would then join the Kirchin band. His entry into the band came about as a result of his going to see Rory Blackwell who was an acquaintance of his. Blackwell was the vocalist with the band. After the show had finished, Blackwell informed him he was leaving to pursue a solo career. It was on Blackwell's recommendation and telling them that Webb was a good beat singer that he got the job. Webb joined them in December 1957 and stayed for a year.

Having left the Kirchin band, he returned to Reading with aspirations of being an actor. Webb headed towards London, and got his first job as a dishwasher at The 2i's Coffee Bar in Soho. Between the jobs he would go to club room to perform a few songs. It was there he was spotted by an agent who took him along to a Jack Good Oh Boy! rehearsal. He made two appearances on the show Oh Boy!; one of these performances (from 4th April 1959) survives in the BBC Archives.

According to John Castle of the music trade magazine, Record Mail (in May 1959), Webb talked about his time with the Basil Kirchin Band and how he gained a great deal of experience during the year he stayed with the outfit. That month, Webb had made his solo debut with the release, "Warm Your heart" / "Hey Miss Fannie" which was released on Parlophone. Both sides were orininally recorded by black vocal groups. "Warm Your Heart" was recorded by The Drifters and "Hey, Miss Fannie" was a 1952 hit for The Clovers. In spite of the R&B genre, Webb managed to get his voice and the musical content to come together.

Webb's single, "Streamline Baby" / "The Rough and the Smooth" was released on Parlophone. It was reviewed in the October 10, 1959 issue of Melody Maker, with the reviewer calling it "Two fairly firm rockers with a really jiving beat". The Birmingham Weekly Post said that he had made the news again with the release. The B side was from the film, The Rough and the Smooth, released the same year. It was reviewed in the Movie Music section of Picturegoer, with the reviewer calling it "catchy, but as callous as a sock in the jaw". It was also reviewed in the October 17 issue of Disc. The reviewer Don Nicholl gave it two stars, and said Webb sang what might be classified as another version of "Living Doll". Nicoll also noted that the rhythm backing was by Ken Jones. The B side, "The Rough and the Smooth" had Webb rapping competently, with Jones whipping up the guitar accompaniment.

=== 1960s to 1970s ===
Webb was on the same tour as Eddie Cochran when a car crash killed Cochran in Bath, Somerset in 1960.

Along with Adam Faith with the John Barry Seven, The Red Price Quintet, Johnny Wade, and The Bell Tones, Webb was to appear on Saturday Club on 22 October, 1960.

In 1970, the film The Wife Swappers was released. It was directed by Stanley Long and Derek Ford. Eaton was the credited composer.

== Acting career ==
Webb held a few acting gigs in the early 1960s. He played Mike in the 1962 film Some People. In 1963, he played "Blackie" in one episode of the ITV drama The Human Jungle, and the same year was a soldier in episode 25 of Moonstrike.

== Discography ==
=== Singles ===
- "Warm Your Heart" / "Hey, Miss Fannie" - Parlophone 45- R4549 - 1959
- "Streamline Baby" / "The Rough and the Smooth" (from film of same name) - Parlophone 45-R4587 - 1959

=== Appearances ===
- Rockin' Again at the Two Is
- British Rock & Roll 1955-1960
