= Blues shouter =

Type of blues singer

A blues shouter is a blues singer, capable of singing unamplified with a band.

Notable blues shouters include:

- Big Maybelle
- Big Mama Thornton
- Piney Brown
- Walter Brown, of the Jay McShann orchestra
- Beulah Bryant
- H-Bomb Ferguson
- Wynonie Harris
- Screamin' Jay Hawkins
- Duke Henderson, who operated mainly in the late 1940s and early 1950s.
- Jimmy Rushing, blues shouter with Count Basie.
- Big Joe Turner – his style hardly changed at all between 1938's "Roll 'Em Pete", and 1954's "Shake, Rattle and Roll". AllMusic called Turner "the premier blues shouter of the postwar era".
- Eddie "Cleanhead" Vinson, an unusual combination of blues shouter and bebop alto saxophone player.
- Joe Williams (jazz singer)
- Jimmy Witherspoon, who also appeared with Jay McShann.
- Billy Wright
- Howlin' Wolf (Chester Burnett)
