= H-Bomb Ferguson =

American jump blues singer

- Also known as: Bob Ferguson
- Born: Robert Percell Ferguson; May 9, 1929; Torest, Charleston County, South Carolina, United States
- Died: November 26, 2006 (aged 77) Cincinnati, Ohio, U.S.
- Genres: Rhythm and blues, jump blues
- Occupations: Singer, bandleader
- Years active: 1948–2006
- Labels: Derby, Savoy, Federal, others

Robert Percell Ferguson (May 9, 1929 – November 26, 2006), who performed as H-Bomb Ferguson, was an American jump blues singer. He was an early pioneer of the rock and roll style of the mid-1950s, featuring driving rhythm, intensely shouted vocals, honking tenor saxophone solos, and outlandish personal appearance. Ferguson sang and played piano in a flamboyant style, wearing colorful wigs.

== Early life ==
Born in Torest, Charleston County, South Carolina, Ferguson was the eleventh of twelve children. His father was a Baptist preacher who paid for his piano lessons on condition he learned sacred melodies. Ferguson had other ideas, recalling "After church was over, while the people was all standing outside talking, me and my friends would run back inside and I'd play the blues on the piano."

== Career ==
At the age of 19, Ferguson was on the road with Joe Liggins and the Honeydrippers. They moved to New York, where Ferguson branched off on his own, getting a gig at the nightclub Baby Grand Club in Harlem, billed as "The Cobra Kid."

A blues shouter, he first recorded as Bob Ferguson in New York in 1950, for Derby Records, whose drummer Jack "The Bear" Parker (according to most sources) gave him the nickname "H-Bomb" and became his manager. His debut was followed by releases on Atlas and Prestige, before he signed a recording contract with Savoy Records in 1951. Several saxophone-driven singles followed, in the style of Wynonie Harris, and "Good Lovin'" was regionally successful though failing to reached the national charts.

Ferguson toured clubs with Ruth Brown, Clarence "Gatemouth" Brown and Redd Foxx, singing and telling jokes. He also released singles on mostly small record labels. In 1957, he moved to Cincinnati, Ohio, and signed with King Records. His recordings on the King subsidiary Federal Records included "Mary, Little Mary" and "Midnight Ramblin' Tonight". He formed his own band, H-Bomb Ferguson and his Mad Lads, and developed his own style with more focus on his piano playing, touring through the 1960s.

He retired from performing in the early 1970s, but made several comebacks, notably performing at blues festivals in Britain and Europe during the 1980s and 1990s in a characteristically flamboyant style, wearing a variety of multicolored wigs. Backed by The Bluesmen, he released "Bad Times Blues" in 1989 as a local LP release in Cincinnati under Papa Lou Recordings number 801 from Vetco Enterprises. Backed by the Medicine Men, he recorded his first album, Wiggin' Out, for Chicago's Earwig Music in 1993.

== Death and legacy ==
Ferguson died in 2006 at the Hospice of Cincinnati, of complications from emphysema and cardiopulmonary disease, aged 77.

His early work was featured in a compilation album, H-Bomb Ferguson: Big City Blues, 1951-54. A documentary was made of his life, entitled The Life And Times Of H-bomb Ferguson.
