= Jimmy Nelson (singer) =

American singer-songwriter (1919–2007)

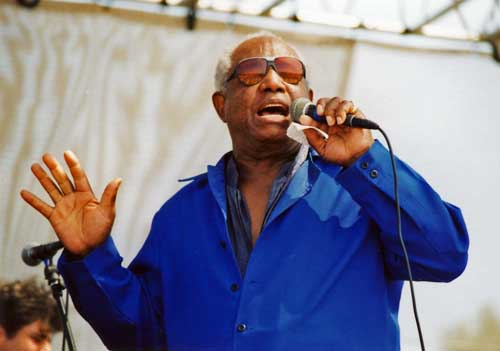
- Nelson at the Long Beach Blues Festival, 1996

Background information
- Also known as: Jimmy "T99" Nelson
- Born: James Nelson; April 7, 1919; Philadelphia, Pennsylvania, U.S.
- Died: July 29, 2007 (aged 88) Houston, Texas, U.S.
- Genres: Jump blues, rhythm and blues, swing
- Occupation: Singer
- Instrument: Vocals
- Years active: 1948–2007
- Labels: Olliet Records; RPM Records; Kent Records; Chess Records; Music City Records; Paradise Records; All Boy Records; Bullseye Blues & Jazz; Nettie Marie Records; Ace

James Nelson (April 7, 1919 – July 29, 2007), known as Jimmy "T99" Nelson, was an American jump blues and rhythm and blues shouter and songwriter. With a recording career that spanned over 50 years, Jimmy "T99" Nelson became a distinguished elder statesman of American music. His best known recordings are "T-99 Blues" and "Meet Me With Your Black Dress On". Nelson notably worked with Duke Robillard and Otis Grand.

== Career ==
Nelson got his start singing in church. In 1941, he saw a performance by Big Joe Turner while he was visiting Oakland, California, and realized he wanted to sing the blues. Turner taught Nelson about singing, performance and the music business. Nelson, in turn, absorbed the shouting style of his mentor.

From 1951 through 1961, Jimmy Nelson and the Peter Rabbit Trio released eight singles with the Bihari Brothers' Modern/RPM label. The biggest of these was "T-99 Blues" (which referred to the old Texas Highway #99), which debuted in June 1951. It stayed on the US Billboard R&B chart for twenty-one weeks and reached number 1. In 1952, Nelson had another RPM hit with "Meet Me With Your Black Dress On".

Nelson began touring, performing with bands led by Joe Liggins and Roy Milton, and playing venues including the Apollo and Howard theaters. He cut singles for a number of labels including Kent, Music City, Paradise and All Boy, and Chess (including for them the 1955 "Free and Easy Mind").

From 1955 to 1975, Nelson took a job working construction, though he continued to write songs and sit in with bands.

In the 1980s, Nelson came to the wider attention of blues fans when Ace issued ten of his sides on an album. Sweet Sugar Daddy a compilation album from the Japanese P-Vine Records, which mainly consisted of unreleased studio recordings from the 1960s and 1970s, was also released in 1988.

Nelson resumed touring and in 1999, released a comeback album Rockin' and Shoutin' the Blues from the Bullseye Blues & Jazz label. This album was nominated in two categories of the W.C. Handy Awards the following year. Two more newly recorded albums followed on his own Nettie Marie label prior to his death, both featuring an all-star back-up band including Duke Robillard. In 2004, Ace released Cry Hard Luck, featuring re-issues of Nelson's Kent and RPM recordings from 1951-1961.

== Personal life ==
In 1955, Nelson married Nettie and adopted Houston, Texas as his hometown.

Nelson died of cancer at a nursing home in Houston on July 29, 2007.

== Discography ==
Meet Me With Your Black Dress On (sample)
An audio sample of "Meet Me With Your Black Dress On" (1952)

=== Singles ===
- 1951: "T 99 Blues" (RPM 325) as Jimmie Nelson and the Peter Rabbit Trio
- 1953: "Meet Me With Your Black Dress On" (RPM 385)
- 1955: "Free and Easy Mind" (Chess 1587)
- 1956: "The Wheel" (Music City 797)
- 1960: "Unlock the Lock" (Kent 354)
- 1962: "What Was I Supposed To Do' (All Boy 8502)
- 1963: "Tell Me Who" (Paradise 1002; Chess 1877)
- 1965: "I'll Be Ready" (Paradise 1012)

=== Albums ===
- 1999: Rockin' and Shoutin' the Blues (Bullseye Blues 9593) feat. Doug James, Rich Lataille, Clarence Hollimon
- 2002: Take Your Pick (Nettie Marie 001)
- 2005: The Legend (Nettie Marie 002)

=== Compilation albums ===
- 1981: Jimmy "Mr. T 99" Nelson (Ace 10CH 35) [10" LP]
- 1987: Watch That Action (Ace CHD 228)
- 1988: Sweet Sugar Daddy (P-Vine)
- 2003: Cry Hard Luck: The RPM and Kent Recordings 1951-61 (Ace CDCHD 976)
