= Sittin' in With =

American record label

Sittin' in With (sometimes Sittin' in) was an American jazz and blues record label run by Bob Shad. It was active from 1948 to 1952.

Shad and his brother Morty founded the label in 1948 in New York City, and released swing jazz, mainstream jazz, blues, and R&B music. Shad later went on to work with Jax Records, EmArcy Records, and Mainstream Records.

== Artists ==
- Ray Abrams
- Chu Berry
- Beryl Booker
- Goree Carter
- Ray Charles
- Earl Coleman
- Leroy Dallas
- Julian Dash
- Champion Jack Dupree
- Stan Getz
- Wardell Gray
- Big John Greer
- Al Haig
- John Hardee
- Peppermint Harris
- Smokey Hogg
- Lightnin' Hopkins
- Dave Lambert
- Brownie McGhee
- Elmore Nixon
- Buddy Stewart
- Arbee Stidham
- Sonny Terry
- Charlie Ventura
- Curley Weaver
- James Wayne

== Bibliography ==
- Howard Rye, "Sittin' in With". The New Grove Dictionary of Jazz. 2nd edition, ed. Barry Kernfeld, Oxford, 2004. ISBN 978-1561592845
- "The Shad Labels", Blues Research, no. 16 (n.d. [?1966]), p. 2
- A. Shaw: Honkers and Shouters: the Golden Years of Rhythm and Blues (New York, 1978), p. 140, ISBN 978-0026100007
- N. Darwen and T. Shad: “Bob Shad the Record Man: the Sittin’ in With Story,” Blues & Rhythm, no. 100 (1995), p. 16 [incl. discography]
