= I'm in the Mood (John Lee Hooker song) =

Single by John Lee Hooker
- B-side: "How Can You Do It"
- Released: October 1951
- Recorded: August 1951
- Studio: United Sound Systems, Detroit, Michigan, U.S.
- Genre: Blues
- Length: 2:43
- Label: Modern
- Songwriter: John Lee Hooker
- Producer: Bernard Besman

"I'm in the Mood" is a blues song written and originally performed by John Lee Hooker, and first recorded by him in 1951. The original recording is reportedly one of the highest-selling blues records of all time.

== Original recording ==
The song was recorded by Hooker at the United Sound Systems recording studio in Detroit, Michigan in mid-August 1951, with second guitarist Eddie Kirkland. The session was run by record producer Bernard Besman, with sound engineer Joe Siracuse. Hooker claimed that the song was inspired by Glenn Miller's "In the Mood". Besman overdubbed two vocals by Hooker, one of the first times that technique had been used on record though it had been pioneered earlier by Les Paul. According to reviewer Richie Unterberger:

The overdubs weren't entirely in sync either, creating what was then and still is an eerie effect, like that of a voice echoing around the inside of a water tower. The song's chief attributes, however, are Hooker's trademark footstomp timekeeping beats, and the stinging guitars (by both Hooker and second guitarist Eddie Kirkland). The melody of "I'm in the Mood" is minimal, as is the message, repeatedly coming back to an assured declaration that Hooker's in the mood for love. But the reward of "I'm in the Mood" is indeed the mood itself of the recording: stark, spooky, and earthy, the relatively sweetly crooned title-chorus making it more memorable than several other of Hooker's similar early recordings.

As with Hooker's earlier hit, "Boogie Chillen'", Besman leased the recording to Modern Records in Los Angeles, and a co-writing credit (and, hence, a share of royalties) for "I'm in the Mood" was given to "Jules Taub", a pseudonym used by one of Modern's owners, Jules Bihari. The record entered the Billboard Rhythm and Blues chart in October 1951, spending four weeks in the number one position from November, and reputedly selling a million copies.

== Later recordings ==
The song has been recorded by several other musicians including John Hammond Jr. (1967), Buddy Guy and Junior Wells (1981), and Jack Bruce and Gary Moore (2002).

It was also re-recorded by Hooker with Bonnie Raitt, on his 1989 album The Healer. Hooker said: "Bonnie had been doin' it herself on her shows, which I didn't know until she told me, and she had it down so pat. She said 'I'm gonna do that'n with you, 'I'm in the Mood'. If I ain't gonna do 'I'm in the Mood' I ain't gonna do nothin'', I said, 'Okay, Bonnie, you do it.'" Raitt described the recording, in a dimly-lit studio, as "one of the highest erotic experiences of my life." The song won a Grammy for Best Traditional Blues Recording in 1989.
