= Fool, Fool, Fool =

Single by The Clovers

from the album Dance Party
- B-side: "Needless"
- Released: August 1951
- Recorded: 1951
- Genre: R&B
- Length: 2:36
- Label: Atlantic
- Songwriter: Ahmet Ertegun

The Clovers singles chronology
"Don't You Know I Love You" (1951)	"Fool, Fool, Fool" (1951)	"One Mint Julep" (1952)

"Fool, Fool, Fool" is a 1951 song by The Clovers. The single was their second number one on the R&B chart and their most successful song on that chart, spending six weeks at the number-one position.

Elvis Presley covered the song in 1955. This cover of the song wasn't released until 1992 when it was included on a box set of 50's recordings.
