= Don't You Know I Love You =

Single by The Clovers

from the album The Clovers
- B-side: "Skylark"
- Released: March 25, 1951
- Recorded: 1950
- Genre: R&B
- Length: 2:47
- Label: Atlantic
- Producer: Al Schmitt

The Clovers singles chronology
"Don't You Know I Love You" (1951)	"Fool, Fool, Fool" (1951)

"Don't You Know I Love You" is the 1951 debut single by the Clovers. The single was the first of three singles to make the top spot on the R&B charts. Al Schmitt helped engineer the recording.
