= Bad, Bad Whiskey =

Single by Amos Milburn and his Aladdin Chickenshackers
- B-side: "I’m Going to Tell My Mama"
- Released: October 1950
- Genre: R&B
- Label: Aladdin Records
- Songwriter(s): Maxwell Davis

"Bad, Bad Whiskey" is a song by Maxwell Davis that was released in 1950 by Amos Milburn. The single was the last time Milburn reached the number one position on the US Billboard R&B Chart.

== Song Background ==
The song is usually credited to Maxwell Davis alone, but some sources say it was initially an instrumental titled Bristol Drive, which Milburn adapted by blending in some alcohol-based lyrics.

=== Cover Versions ===
Bad, Bad Whiskey became one of the most enduring “blues in a bottle” songs. The song has been covered many times, most recently by Colin James in October 2016 on his album Blue Highways.

== Other uses ==
Bob Dylan played the song in the episode “Spring Cleaning” (Episode 50) of his series Theme Time Radio Hour in April 2007.
