= Black Night (Charles Brown song) =

Single by Charles Brown Trio
- B-side: "Once There Live a Fool"
- Released: January 1951
- Recorded: December 21, 1950
- Studio: Radio Recorders, Los Angeles
- Genre: Blues
- Length: 3:07
- Label: Aladdin
- Songwriter: Jessie Mae Robinson

Charles Brown Trio singles chronology
"My Baby's Gone" (1950)	"Black Night" (1951)	"I'll Always Be in Love with You" (1951)

"Black Night" is a blues song recorded by Charles Brown in 1951. Although the songwriter credit is usually given to Jessie Mae Robinson, "Brown is believed to have written 'Black Night'", according to author Steve Sullivan.

== Background ==
A slow minor-key blues, it is performed in the West Coast blues-style. Brown, on vocal and piano, is backed by a small combo with the addition of Maxwell Davis on saxophone.

"Black Night" was Brown's second single to reach number one on Billboard's R&B chart. It remained at the top position for 14 weeks, longer than any other single. In 2005, it was inducted into the Blues Foundation Blues Hall of Fame as a "Classic of Blues Recording – Single or Album Track".

The song is included on numerous compilations of Brown's music as well as collections of West Coast blues and R&B music. In 1971, Brown re-recorded it for his album Blues 'n' Brown (1972).

== Cover versions ==
Many musicians have adapted "Black Night" in a variety of styles and the Blues Foundation notes renditions by:

- Bobby Bland went to #99 on the Hot 100 in 1964
- Dr. John
- Willie Nelson
- Muddy Waters.
