= Rory Blackwell =

English musician (1933–2019)

Rory Blackwell

Stanley Reginald Blackwell (22 June 1933 – 19 December 2019) was an English rock and roll musician, bandleader of the Blackjacks, singer, drummer and songwriter.

== Biography ==
Stanley Reginald Blackwell was born in London in 1933. He founded the first British rock and roll band, and put on rock and roll at Studio 51 in September 1956. At The 2i's Coffee Bar on 24 January 1957, he gave Terry Dene, then known as Terry Williams, his first job. Blackwell fronted him at the Razzle Dazzle Club, in which Dene was billed as "the new singing sensation Terry Williams". Blackwell and his Blackjacks starred in the 1957 film Rock You Sinners.

Dean was a member of the Basil Kirchin Band as the vocalist. An acquaintance of his, Dean Webb, went along to see him one night. After the show, Blackwell told him he was leaving to go solo. He recommended Webb as a replacement, saying that he was a good beat singer. Webb got the job and stayed with the Basil Kirchin Band for a year.

In 1959, Blackwell spotted the 16-year-old pianist Clive Powell (Georgie Fame) in a summer holiday camp in Wales, where he offered him a job as a piano player with The Blackjacks. After the season ended, Powell left, as new opportunities arose.

His group recorded "Bye Bye Love", later covered by The Everly Brothers. Blackwell also performed "Bony Moronie", "Red Roses", "Daddy Don't You Walk So Fast", "Great Balls of Fire", and "Rory's Rock", then toured Europe and the UK with stars from the US.

In 1968, Rory Blackwell's 1968 Rock'n'roll Show Live (EMI/Parlophone) was released, with the tracks "Let's Have a Party", "Rock Around the Clock", "Great Balls of Fire", "Be Bop a Lula", "Shake Rattle and Roll", "Hound Dog", "Whole Lotta Shakin' Goin' On", "Bony Moronie", "Heartbreak Hotel" and "Rory's Rock". After the launching of the Apollo 11 in 1969, Blackwell wrote and released the orchestral piece Apollo 11 : Sea of Tranquility (EMI/Parlophone).

In 1978, another Blackwell album was released, called The Two Sides of Rory Blackwell (Ellie Jay Records). Tracks included "Bony Moronie", "Amarillo", "Teddy Bear", "Beatles Medley" and "Wipe Out".

He appeared in many television programmes, such as Six-Five Special, Cool For Cats, and Oh Boy!, in which he appeared with Lord Rockingham's XI. Later, Blackwell toured with the Beach Boys.

During the 1960s, Blackwell worked with the young bassist Nick Simper, who later joined Johnny Kidd's band and went on to become one of the founding members of Deep Purple.

He attempted many world records for charity, mainly involving feats of longevity or speed on musical instruments. Many of these appeared in Guinness World Records editions.

In the 1980s, Blackwell worked as the Entertainments Manager at the Welcome Family Holiday Park, Dawlish Warren, Devon, where he continued pleasing the crowds and breaking drumming records.

According to a 2008 local news report, Blackwell was retired and living in South Devon. He died, aged 86, on 19 December 2019.

== Sources ==
- Andrews, Lindy, "From pithead sirens to jazz stage", Hawkes Bay Today 3 February 2007
- Herald Express, "The original rock 'n' roll star", 25 November 2008
- Spokane Chronicle, "Ex-Beach Boy Makes Waves With Musical World Record", 29 May 1985
