= I Got Loaded (Peppermint Harris song) =

Song by Peppermint Harris
- B-side: "It's You, Yes, It's You"
- Released: September 1951
- Recorded: 1951
- Genre: R&B
- Length: 2:28
- Label: Aladdin
- Songwriter(s): Peppermint Harris

Peppermint Harris singles chronology
"I Got Loaded" (1951)	"Have Another Drink and Talk to Me" (1951)

"I Got Loaded" is a 1951 song by Peppermint Harris. The single was Harris's second and final chart hit, peaking at number one on the U.S. R&B chart.
