= The Clovers =

American rhythm and blues/doo-wop vocal group

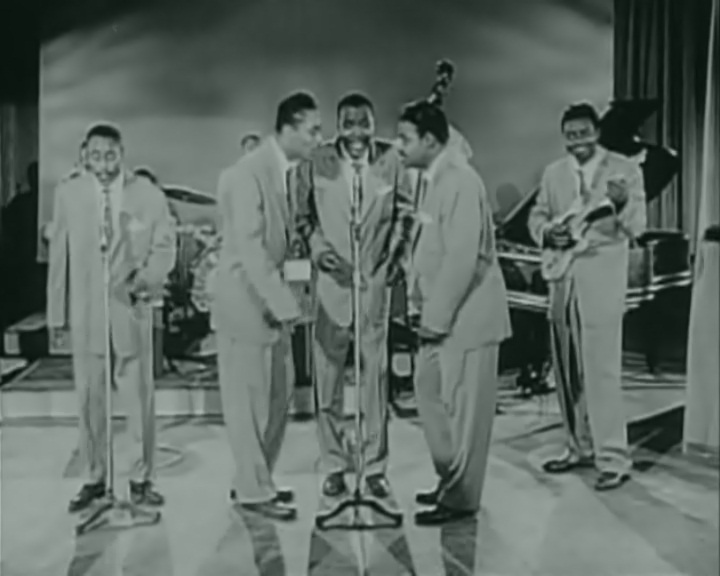
- the Clovers performing in 1955

Background information
- Origin: Washington, D.C., U.S.
- Genres: R&B, rock and roll, doo wop
- Years active: 1946–present
- Labels: Atlantic, United Artists
- Members: Harold Winley; Carlos Wilson; Tyrone Burwell; Franklen Poole; Edward "Ike" Bowers
- Past members: John "Buddy" Bailey; Harold Lucas; Charlie White; Matthew McQuater; Bill Harris; Billy Mitchell; Thomas Woods; Billy Shelton; John Phillip; Charles R. Stevens; James "Toy" Walton; Robert Russell; Roosevelt "Tippie" Hubbard; Nathaniel Bouknight; Peggy Winley Mills; Ann Winley; Jimmy Taylor; Daniel "Steep" Abbott; Juan Hawkins; Johnny Mason; William Rawlings; Antwan Drayton; Ron "Meatball" Reace; Tye Lovell; King Raymond Green

The Clovers are an American rhythm and blues/doo-wop vocal group who became one of the biggest selling acts of the 1950s. They had a top 30 US hit in 1959 with the Leiber and Stoller song "Love Potion No. 9".

== History ==
=== 1946 to 1960 ===
The group was formed at Armstrong High School in Washington, D.C., in 1946 by Harold Lucas (baritone), Billy Shelton, and Thomas Woods. Initially a trio, they expanded to a quartet with the addition of John "Buddy" Bailey (lead) and began calling themselves The Four Clovers. Billy Shelton was replaced by Matthew McQuater (tenor) in 1948. As The Four Clovers, the group started to appear at local amateur music shows including the WWDC amateur hour show hosted by Jack Lowe Endler at the Republic Theatre. That brought them to the attention of a wider audience including Harold Winley (bass) who, after hearing them on WWDC, decided to introduce himself to the group. By the end of 1948 Woods had been replaced by Winley. An introduction to Lou Krefetz, a record sales distributor who became their manager, led to their first recording session for New York's Rainbow Records and the release of one single in November 1950, "Yes Sir, That's My Baby" / "When You Come Back to Me".

By the end of 1950 Bill Harris (born in April 14, 1925, Nashville) had joined as their guitarist; his blues- and jazz-inflected playing would become an integral part of their sound. Krefetz then brought them to the attention of Atlantic Records, which signed them in February 1951. The Clovers were immediately booked by the Shaw Artists agency to perform at the Apollo Theater in Harlem starting on 15 February. A week later, on 22 February, they went into the studio for their first recording session for Atlantic, which included the Ahmet Ertegun composition "Don't You Know I Love You"; that song, backed with the standard "Skylark", was their first top-ten R&B hit for the label and remained on the R&B chart for five months. Their second recording session resulted in the release of "Fool, Fool, Fool" in August 1951, which by September had reached number one on the R&B chart. The Clovers' lead vocalist, Buddy Bailey, was drafted into the U.S. Army at the end of August 1951 and John Phillip was brought in to replace him. Philip was soon replaced by Charlie White (born in 1930, Washington, DC), who had been in the vocal groups The Dominoes and The Checkers. The tracks "One Mint Julep" (written by Rudy Toombs) and the Ertegun composition "Middle of the Night" (originally released as a 10" vinyl single) were both top ten hits on the R&B chart of May 1952. Their next release, "Ting-A-Ling", peaked at number 2 on the Billboard R&B chart (September 1952) and reached number one on the Billboard Juke Box R&B chart. They followed up this early success with a string of R&B hits, including "Hey Miss Fannie" / "I Played The Fool" (released in October 1952), "Good Lovin'" (top ten R&B hit November 1953) and "Little Mama" / "Lovey Dovey" (recorded in September 1953 with Charlie White on lead vocals). By the end of 1953 White had been replaced by Billy Mitchell. Buddy Bailey was discharged from the army in May 1954 and rejoined the group. The releases "I've Got My Eyes on You" and "Your Cash Ain't Nothin' But Trash" (written by Charles Calhoun, with Billy Mitchell on lead vocals) featured in the top 30 best-selling R&B records of 1954, with "Lovey Dovey" proving to be the most successful Clovers release of that year.

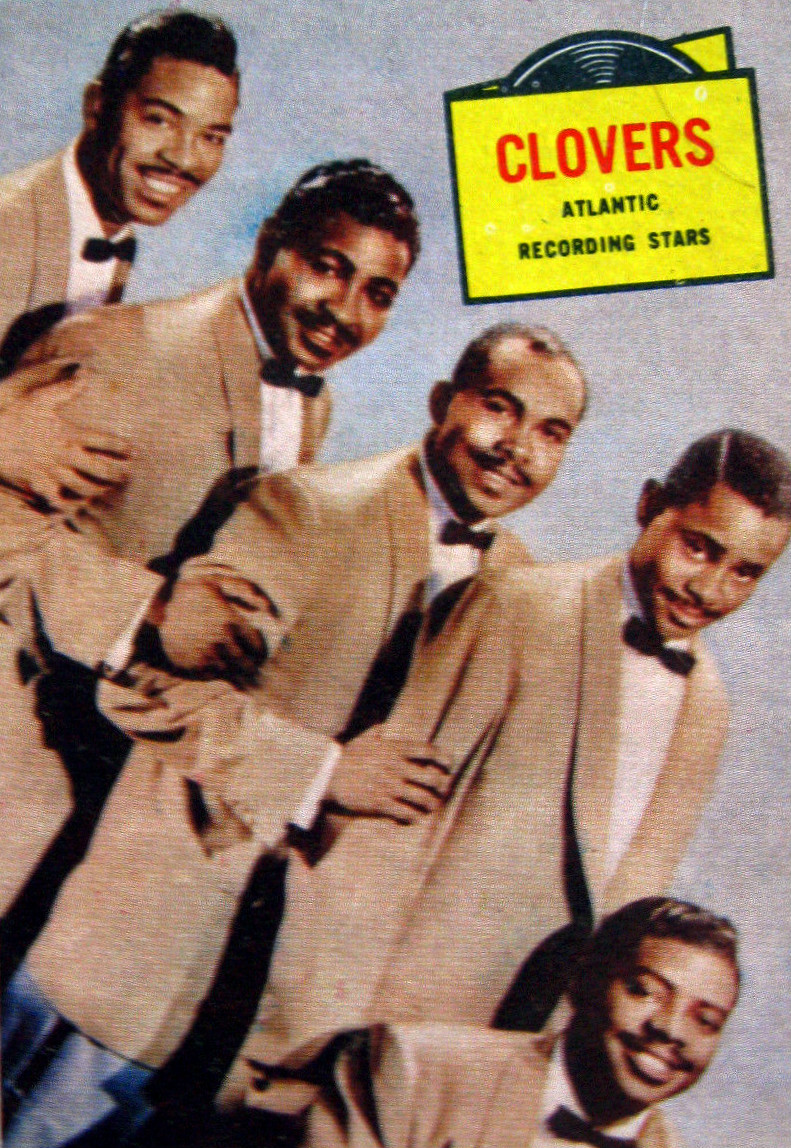
The group in 1957

The Clovers continued to record with Bailey and Mitchell sharing lead vocal duties. The single "Blue Velvet" / "If You Love Me" was released in February 1955. In April the group recorded four tracks; two from that session, "Nip Sip" / "If I Could Be Loved By You", were released in August and entered the top 20 of the R&B chart in September 1955. "Devil or Angel" was released in January 1956 and entered the top five of the R&B chart in February. Their next release, "Love, Love, Love" (recorded in March 1956), charted in the R&B top ten of June and reached the top 50 of the national chart in August. In April 1957 Quincy Jones arranged five tracks for the group, of which two—"So Young" and "I I I Love You"—were released as a double A-sided single (Atlantic 1139), while "Pretty Pretty Eyes", "Baby Darling" and "Shakin'" were not issued. Krefetz left Atlantic and formed Poplar Records in June 1957. The Clovers' Atlantic contract expired in July 1957 and Krefetz signed Mitchell in September as a solo artist to his Poplar label. In February 1958 Krefetz said that Mitchell would continue recording with The Clovers as well as pursuing his solo career on Poplar. Krefetz signed The Clovers to Poplar Records in May 1958. Poplar was purchased by United Artists Records in 1959. The Clovers, then part of the United Artists' roster of acts, entered the studio for their first UA recording session in June 1959, which resulted in the July release of "Love Potion No. 9" featuring Billy Mitchell on lead vocals. "Love Potion No. 9" (written by Jerry Leiber and Mike Stoller) became the biggest hit of their career, peaking at number 23 on the Billboard Hot 100 chart of November 1959.

=== 1961 to present ===
In 1961 their United Artists contract expired and they moved to Winley Records. The label was started in 1956 by Paul Winley, brother of The Clovers' bass Harold Winley. Paul Winley had written songs for the group (before their move to his label), Big Joe Turner and Ruth Brown. Winley Records had also released songs featuring the former Clovers' vocalist Charlie White, "Nobody's Fault But Mine" / "Dearest To Me" (1958). However, their sojourn on Winley Records did not prove successful, and they disbanded in 1961.

The break-up resulted in the creation of two new groups. John "Buddy" Bailey continued recording for Winley Records, releasing in 1961 "They're Rockin Down the Street"/"Be My Baby" credited to The Fabulous Clovers featuring Bailey. Harold Lucas and Billy Mitchell formed a new quartet with James "Toy" Walton and Robert Russell, recording four tracks for Atlantic in October 1961 which resulted in the December release of a double-A sided single "Drive It Home" / "The Bootie Green" credited to The Clovers. Mitchell left in 1962 and was replaced by Roosevelt "Tippie" Hubbard. With Hubbard on lead vocals, the Lucas group recorded and released records as "Tippie and the Clovermen" and "Tippie and the Clovers" for Tiger Records, a subsidiary of Rust Records. In December 1962 "Bossa Nova Baby" (written by Leiber and Stoller) / "The Bossa Nova" was released, credited to Tippie and the Clovers. Also released in 1962 on Stenton Records was "Please Mr Sun" / "Gimme Gimme Gimme", credited to Tippie and the Clovermen. John Bailey's group, by this time consisting of Nathaniel Bouknight, Peggy Winley Mills (sister of Paul and Harold Winley) and Ann Winley (wife of Paul Winley), recorded for Porwin Records, another Winley label. In June 1963 they released "One More time" / "Stop Pretending", credited to The Clovers featuring Buddy Bailey. By the end of 1963 Harold Lucas, John Bailey and Harold Winley had reformed The Clovers. The trio remained together for a little over a year, with Harold Winley leaving after their performance at the Apollo Theater on 1 January 1965.

The Searchers' remake of "Love Potion No. 9", released at the end of 1964, became a US top-five hit in January 1965 and revitalized interest in the original recording by The Clovers. Tracks from the Winley and Porwin catalog (including a re-recorded version of "Love Potion No. 9" with Buddy Bailey on lead) were licensed to Pickwick International Records (a UK budget label), which released the album The Original Love Potion No. 9 by The Clovers. In April 1965 Bailey and Lucas entered the recording studio with Robert Russell (bass) and Jimmy Taylor (tenor), which resulted in the release of "He Sure Could Hypnotize" / "Poor Baby" on Port Records. The record met with little success and Lucas and Bailey disbanded the project that year.

John Bailey formed a group and re-recorded "Devil or Angel" and "Love Potion No. 9", both released as singles on Lana Records in 1965 and credited to The Clovers. Lucas and Russell brought back Tippie Hubbard and Toy Walton and added a fifth member, Al Fox. In 1966 the group recorded four tracks as "Tippie and The Wisemen" for Shrine Records. That same year Tippie and The Wisemen changed their name to The Clovers. Harold Winley started a group in 1968 with Bobby Adams, Johnny Taylor and Ray Loper, recording for Josie Records, releasing "Try My Lovin' On You" / "Sweet Side of a Soulful Woman" in 1968 credited to The Clovers.

Robert Russell died in 1969 and Lucas invited John Bowie to join. In October 1975 Lucas, Tippie Hubbard, Toy Walton and Bowie released a disco track, "Bump Jive", on Aladdin Records credited to The Clovers. Shortly after the recording Walton died and Johnny Mason was invited to join the Lucas group. Harold Winley joined Jimmy Nabbie's Ink Spots in 1976, remaining with them until the formation of The Original Clovers featuring Harold Winley in 2009. Steve Charles joined the Lucas group in 1978. In October 1981 Harold Lucas, John Bowie, Johnny Mason and Steve Charles filed for the trademark The Clovers. which was registered (Serial Number 73333530) in November 1982 (renewed in 2002). Roosevelt "Tippie" Hubbard died in April 1985.

In May 1988, the Lucas group (Steve Charles, Johnny Mason, Harold Lucas and John Bowie) re-recorded "Drive It Home" (credited to The Clovers) for Ripete Records, a small independent label based in Elliott, South Carolina, which released it that year as a single specifically for the Carolina Beach Music market. John Bailey, Harold Lucas, Matthew McQuater and Harold Winley performed together in October 1988 at the Rhythm and Blues Foundation (a Washington, D.C.-based organization started in 1988 to promote and support artists) show in Austin, Texas, to raise funds for Bill Harris, who had fallen ill. Bill Harris (guitar) died at the age of 63 in Washington, D.C., on 6 December 1988.

Steve Charles had retired by the end of 1990 and Chuck Battle was invited to join the Lucas group. Battle left in 1992 and was replaced by Preston Monroe, who was later replaced by David Warren. Lucas became ill and stopped touring in 1993 and Richie Merritt was invited to join the group as his replacement. Harold Lucas died at the age of 61 in Washington, D.C., on 6 January 1994. John "Buddy" Bailey died on 3 February 1994 in Las Vegas, Nevada. Prior to his death, Bailey performed solo, choosing to work with the established doo wop group The Calvanes (which included former Bailey-Clovers member Bobby Adams) as well as appearances with Jimmy Nabbie's Ink Spots. Johnny Mason, Lamont Greenfield, John Bowie and Richie Merritt performed on the PBS special Doo Wop 51 in May 2000, which received its first broadcast on the Pittsburgh channel WQED in August, followed by a national release in December. Matthew McQuater died at the age of 73 in Dallas, Texas, on 19 December 2000. Johnny Mason filed for use of the trademark The Clovers in October 2001 (the case was abandoned in November 2002). John Bowie had both of his legs amputated, and then suffered a fatal heart attack in late 2000. Billy Mitchell, who had sung the lead on "Love Potion No. 9", died at the age of 71 in Washington, D.C., on 5 November 2002. Richie Merritt left the group in 2002; his last performance was the VGHOF induction ceremony. David Warren departed soon after. Mason lead a group featuring former member of The Flamingoes Ron Reace, William Rawlings and Antwan Drayton. In 2009, King Raymond Green filed an application for the trademark The Original Clovers featuring Harold Winley, which received a case suspension. On 11 October 2013, Steve Charles (Charles Stevens), a member of The Clovers group formed by Harold Lucas, and Harold Winley announced that a legal agreement had been reached that allows both parties to continue performing using The Clovers name. Johnny Mason died on April 25, 2018.

=== Love Potion No. 9 (alternative version) ===
They recorded two versions of "Love Potion No. 9" for United Artists. The version chosen for the US album Love Potion No. 9 (released 1960 on United Artists and containing different tracks to the later UK Pickwick release with a similar name) has a different ending to the single version that charted. The final verse says:

"I had so much fun that I'm goin' back again... I wonder what'll happen with Love Potion No. 10"

The alternative version is also included on the soundtrack release of the movie American Graffiti. Another one of their songs, "One Mint Julep", was featured in the movie Carol.

== Awards and recognition ==
- 1989 Rhythm and Blues Foundation Pioneer Award.
- 1991 United in Group Harmony (UGHA) Hall of Fame.
- 2002 Vocal Group Hall of Fame.
- 2003 Doo Wop Hall of Fame.
- 2013 R&B Music Hall of Fame 2013 class.

== Discography ==
=== Chart singles ===
Year	Single (A-side, B-side) Both sides from same album except where indicated	Chart Positions		Album
Year	Single (A-side, B-side) Both sides from same album except where indicated	US Pop	US R&B	Album
1951	"Don't You Know I Love You" b/w "Skylark" (Non-album track)	-	1	The Clovers
1951	"Fool, Fool, Fool" b/w "Needless" (Non-album track)	-	1	Dance Party
1952	"One Mint Julep" /	-	2	Their Greatest Recordings: The Early Years
1952	"Middle of the Night"	-	3	The Clovers
1952	"Ting-A-Ling" /	-	1	The Clovers
1952	"Wonder Where My Baby's Gone"	-	7	Non-album track
1952	"Hey, Miss Fannie" /	-	2	The Clovers
1952	"I Played The Fool"	-	3	The Clovers
1953	"Crawlin'" b/w "Yes, It's You"	-	3	The Clovers
1953	"Good Lovin'" b/w "Here Goes A Fool" (from The Clovers)	-	2	Their Greatest Recordings: The Early Years
1953	"Comin' On" b/w "The Feeling Is So Good"	-	9	Non-album tracks
1954	"Lovey Dovey" /	-	2	The Clovers
1954	"Little Mama"	-	4	The Clovers
1954	"Your Cash Ain't Nothin' But Trash" /	-	6	Their Greatest Recordings: The Early Years
1954	"I've Got My Eyes on You"	-	7	The Clovers
1954	"All Righty Oh Sweetie" b/w "I Confess"	-	-	Non-album tracks
1955	"Blue Velvet" b/w "If You Love Me (Why Don't You Tell Me So)" (Non-album track)	-	14	The Clovers
1955	"Love Bug" b/w "In The Morning Time"	-	-	Dance Party
1955	"Nip Sip" b/w "If I Could Be Loved By You"	-	10	Dance Party
1956	"Devil Or Angel" /	-	3	The Clovers
1956	"Hey, Doll Baby"	-	8	Non-album track
1956	"Love, Love, Love" b/w "Your Tender Lips" (from Dance Party)	30	4	The Clovers
1956	"From The Bottom of My Heart" b/w "Bring Me Love"	-	-	Non-album tracks
1956	"A Lonely Fool" b/w "Baby Baby, Oh My Darling"	-	-	Non-album tracks
1957	"Here Comes Romance" b/w "You Good Looking Woman"	-	-	Non-album tracks
1957	"I I I Love You" b/w "So Young"	-	-	Dance Party
1957	"Down in the Alley" b/w "There's No Tomorrow"	-	-	Dance Party
1958	"Wishing For Your Love" b/w "All About You"	-	-	Dance Party
1958	"The Gossip Wheel" b/w "Please Come on To Me"	-	-	Non-album tracks
1958	"The Good Old Summertime" b/w "Idaho"	-	-	Non-album tracks
1959	"Love Potion No. 9" b/w "Stay Awhile"	23	23	Love Potion No. 9
1960	"Lovey" b/w "One Mint Julep"	-	-	Love Potion No. 9
1960	"Easy Lovin'" b/w "I'm Confessin' That I Love You"	-	-	Love Potion No. 9
1960	"Burning Fire" b/w "Yes It's You"	-	-	Non-album tracks
1961	"Have Gun" b/w "The Honeydripper"	/ 110	-	Non-album tracks
1961	"The Bootie Green" b/w "Drive It Home"	-	-	Non-album tracks
1963	"One More Time (Come On)" b/w "Stop Pretending"	/ 134	-	Non-album tracks
1965	"Poor Baby" b/w "He Sure Could Hypnotize"	-	-	Non-album tracks
1968	"For Days" b/w "Too Long Without Some Loving"	-	-	Non-album tracks
1968	"Try My Lovin' On You" b/w "Sweet Side of a Soulful Woman"	-	-	Non-album tracks
