= Peppermint Harris =

American R&B and blues singer and guitarist (1925–1999)

Harrison Demotra Nelson Jr. (July 17, 1925 – March 19, 1999), known as Peppermint Harris, was an American rhythm and blues and jump blues singer and guitarist.

Originally from Texarkana, Texas, he first recorded at Gold Star Studios in Houston, as Peppermint Nelson, in the late 1940s, accompanied by his friend Lightnin' Hopkins. He then made further recordings including, in 1950, "Raining In My Heart" for the Sittin' in With record label run by Bob Shad, who allegedly forgot Nelson's name and released them as by Peppermint Harris.

In 1951, he moved to Modern Records in Los Angeles, California, and had his biggest R&B hit, on the Aladdin Records label, with "I Got Loaded", which reached number one on the U.S. Billboard R&B chart in November that year. He had eight other, less successful recordings, on the same label, switching to other smaller labels in Southern California later in the 1950s and into the 1960s. In 1962, he had a self-titled album, released on the Time label.

Harris later recorded in Shreveport, Louisiana, and worked in Sacramento and New Jersey, before recording a final album on the Home Cooking label in 1995.

He died in Elizabeth, New Jersey, on March 19, 1999, at the age of 73.
