= Billboard Top R&B Records of 1953 =

Billboard Top R&B Records of 1953 is made up of two year-end charts compiled by Billboard magazine ranking the year's top rhythm and blues records based on record sales and juke box plays.

Retail year-end	Juke box year-end	Title	Artist(s)	Label
1	2	"(Mama) He Treats Your Daughter Mean"	Ruth Brown	Atlantic
2	8	"Shake a Hand"	Faye Adams	Herald
3	4	"Hound Dog"	Big Mama Thornton	Peacock
4	5	"Crying in the Chapel"	The Orioles	Jubille
5	9	"The Clock"	Johnny Ace	Duke
6	1	"I Don't Know	Willie Mabon	Chess
7	10	"Good Lovin'"	The Clovers	Atlantic
8	3	"Baby Don't Do It"	The "5" Royales	Apollo
9	7	"Help Me Somebody"	The "5" Royales	Apollo
10	6	"Please Love Me"	B.B. King	RPM
11	16	"Going to the River"	Fats Domino	Imperial
12	19	"Crawlin'"	The Clovers	Atlantic
13	28	"Let Me Go Home, Whiskey"	Amos Milburn	Aladdin
14	24	"I Wanna Know"	The Du Droppers	RCA Victor
15	11	"I'm Mad"	Willie Mabon	Chess
16	27	"Too Much Lovin'"	The "5" Royales	Apollo
17	12	"Soft"	Tiny Bradshaw	King
18	17	"Red Top"	King Pleasure, Betty Carter	Prestige
19	15	"Cross My Heart"	Johnny Ace	Duke
20	NR	"Don't Deceive Me"	Chuck Willis	Okeh
21	20	"Honey Hush"	Big Joe Turner	Atlantic
22	13	"Yes, I Know"	Linda Hayes	Hollywood
23	14	"Please Don't Leave Me"	Fats Domino	Imperial
24	NR	"Wild, Wild Young Men"	Ruth Brown	Atlantic
25	NR	"One Scotch, One Bourbon, One Beer"	Amos Milburn	Aladdin
26	21	"Woke Up This Morning"	B.B. King	RPM
27	NR	"Mercy, Mr. Percy"	Varetta Dillard	Savoy
28	17	"Dream Girl"	Jesse & Marvin	Specialty
29	NR	"Money Honey"	Clyde McPhatter	Atlantic
30	NR	"I Found Out"	The Du Droppers	RCA Victor
NR	22	"Sad Hours"	Little Walter	Chess
NR	23	"Bells"	Dominoes	Federal
NR	25	"24 Hours"	Eddie Boyd	Chess
NR	26	"Bear Cat"	Rufus Thomas	Chess
NR	29	"Hittin' on Me"	Buddy Johnson	Mercury
NR	30	"I'm Gone"	Shirley & Lee	Aladdin

== See also ==
- Billboard No. 1 singles of 1953
- Billboard year-end top 30 singles of 1953
- 1953 in music
