= List of Billboard number-one R&B songs of 1953 =

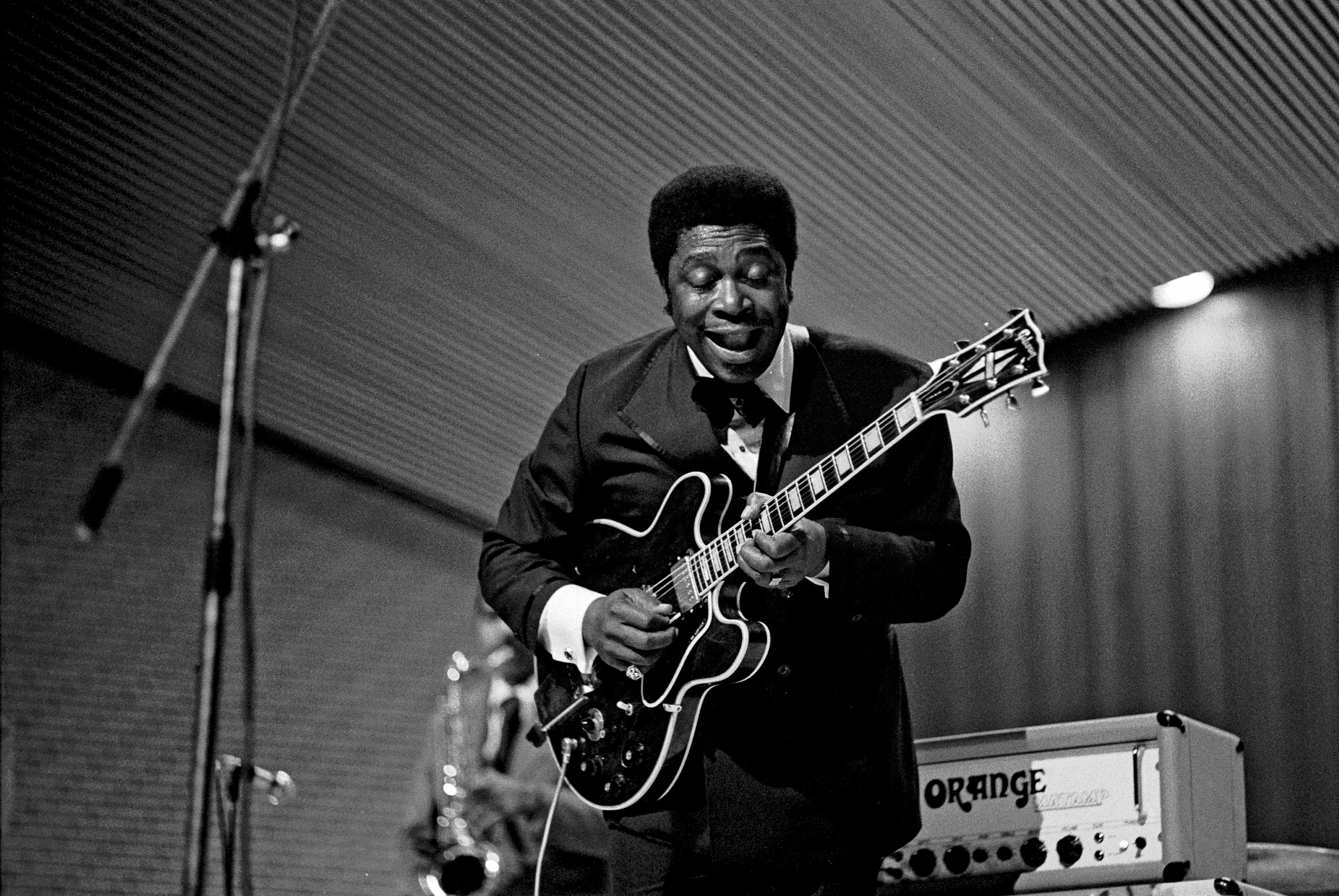
B.B. King (pictured in 1971) topped the juke box chart for three non-consecutive weeks with "Please Love Me".

In 1953, Billboard magazine published two charts specifically covering the top-performing songs in the United States in rhythm and blues and related African-American-oriented music genres: National Best Sellers and Most Played in Juke Boxes. The charts, based on sales in stores and plays in jukeboxes respectively, are considered part of the lineage of the magazine's multimetric R&B chart launched in 1958, which since 2005 has been published under the title Hot R&B/Hip Hop Songs.

In the issue of Billboard dated January 3, 1953, Eddie Boyd was at number one on the juke box chart with "Five Long Years" and Willie Mabon and his Combo topped the best sellers listing with "I Don't Know", both songs retaining their positions from the final week of 1952. The year's longest-running number one on both charts was "Shake a Hand" by Faye Adams; on the best sellers chart it spent nine consecutive weeks in the top spot, and on the juke box listing it spent ten non-consecutive weeks at number one. It was the first in a string of three consecutive number ones for the singer, but after 1957 she never charted again. In the early 1960s she turned to gospel music and reportedly refused to even talk about her secular recordings. Although "Shake a Hand" had the highest total number of weeks atop the juke box chart, the longest unbroken run at number one on that listing was achieved by Mabon's "I Don't Know", which spent six consecutive weeks in the peak position in January and February.

Among the other acts to top the chart for the first time in 1953 was Willie Mae "Big Mama" Thornton, who reached number one on both listings with "Hound Dog", the only charting single of her career. The song would later be covered by Elvis Presley, whose version became a multi-million seller. Although less well known, Thornton's original recording is regarded as highly influential; its accolades include being inducted into the Grammy Hall of Fame and being selected for preservation in the National Recording Registry by the Library of Congress as being "culturally, historically, or aesthetically significant". Four other acts gained their first number ones in 1953, including the acts with the final number one of the year on each chart: Big Joe Turner with "Honey Hush" on the juke box chart and Clyde McPhatter and the Drifters on the best sellers listing. Adams reached number one with "Shake a Hand", the first chart entry of her career. The "5" Royales achieved the same feat, topping both charts in February with "Baby Don't Do It"; the group returned to number one on both listings in June with "Help Me Somebody". This gave the Royales the distinction of having gained two number ones with their first two charting songs, but they would not achieve another chart-topper.

== Chart history ==
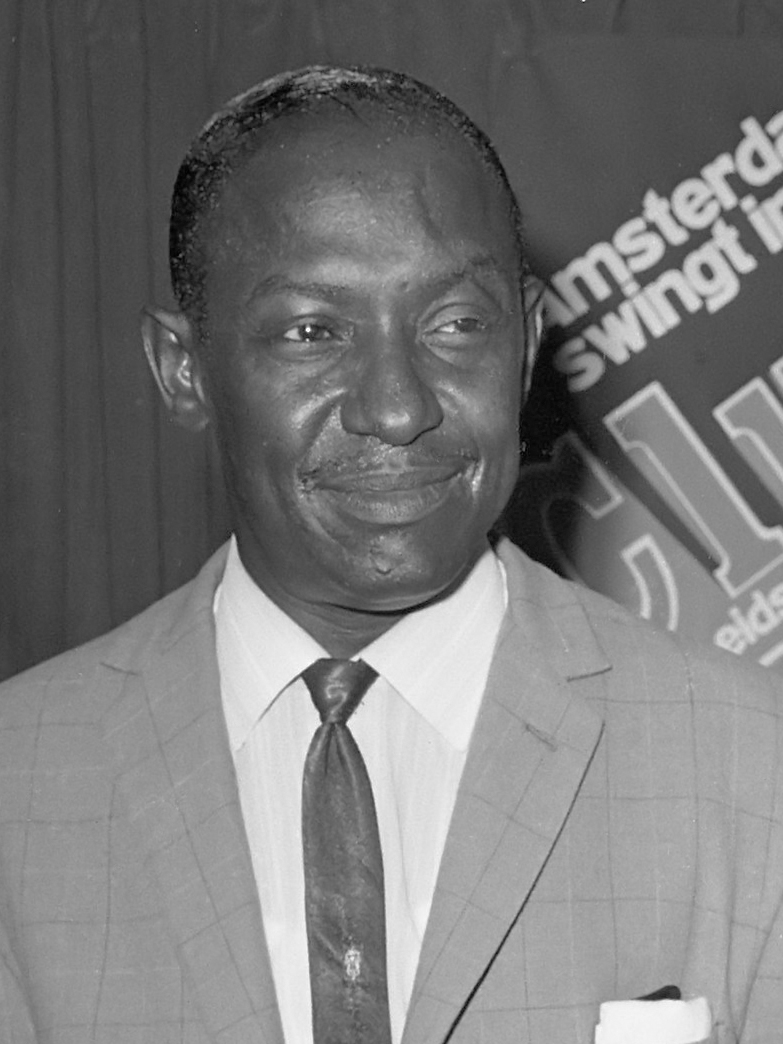
Eddie Boyd (pictured in 1968) began the year at number one on the juke box chart with "Five Long Years".

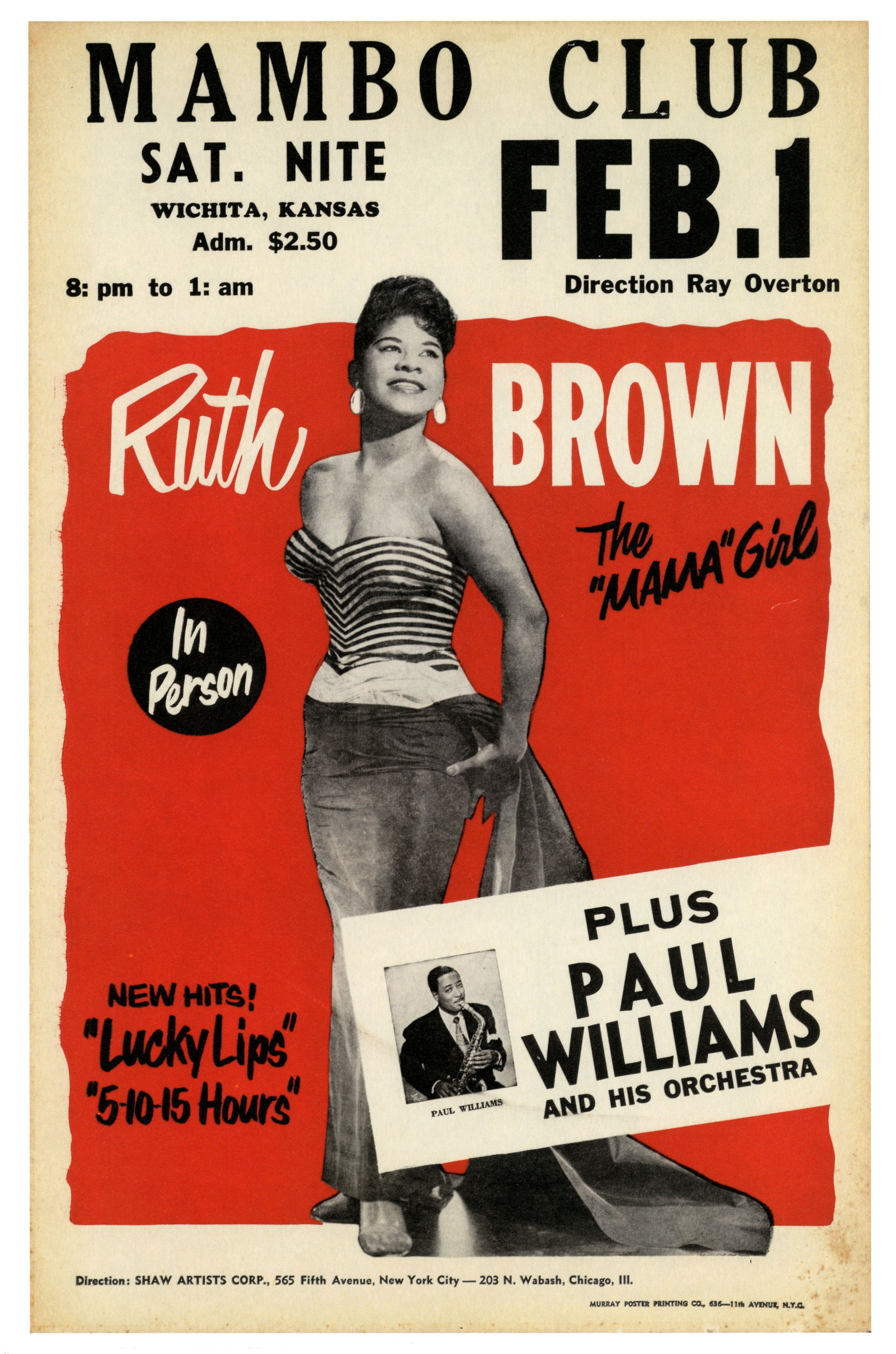
"(Mama) He Treats Your Daughter Mean" was a number one for Ruth Brown.

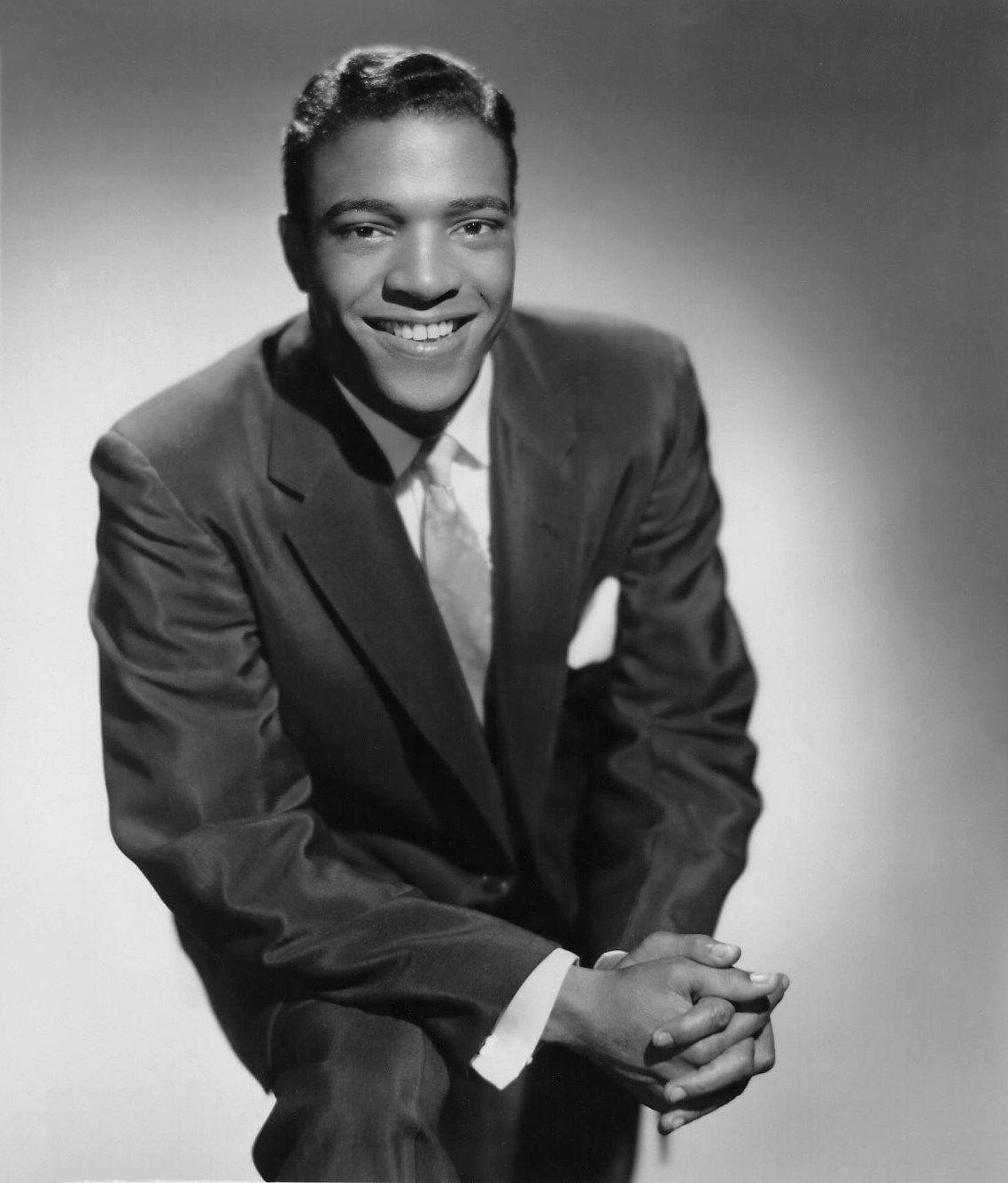
Clyde McPhatter led the Drifters to the year's final number one on the best sellers chart.

Chart history
Issue date	Juke Box		Best Sellers		Ref.
Issue date	Title	Artist(s)	Title	Artist(s)	Ref.
January 3	"Five Long Years"	Eddie Boyd	"I Don't Know"	Willie Mabon and his Combo	
January 10	"I Don't Know"	Willie Mabon and his Combo	"I Don't Know"	Willie Mabon and his Combo	
January 17	"I Don't Know"	Willie Mabon and his Combo	"I Don't Know"	Willie Mabon and his Combo	
January 24	"I Don't Know"	Willie Mabon and his Combo	"I Don't Know"	Willie Mabon and his Combo	
January 31	"I Don't Know"	Willie Mabon and his Combo	"I Don't Know"	Willie Mabon and his Combo	
February 7	"I Don't Know"	Willie Mabon and his Combo	"I Don't Know"	Willie Mabon and his Combo	
February 14	"I Don't Know"	Willie Mabon and his Combo	"I Don't Know"	Willie Mabon and his Combo	
February 21	"I Don't Know"	Willie Mabon and his Combo	"Baby Don't Do It"	The "5" Royales	
February 28	"Baby Don't Do It"	The "5" Royales	"Baby Don't Do It"	The "5" Royales	
March 7	"(Mama) He Treats Your Daughter Mean"	Ruth Brown	"Baby Don't Do It"	The "5" Royales	
March 14	"Baby Don't Do It"	The "5" Royales	"Baby Don't Do It"	The "5" Royales	
March 21	"(Mama) He Treats Your Daughter Mean"	Ruth Brown	"(Mama) He Treats Your Daughter Mean"	Ruth Brown	
March 28	"(Mama) He Treats Your Daughter Mean"	Ruth Brown	"(Mama) He Treats Your Daughter Mean"	Ruth Brown	
April 4	"(Mama) He Treats Your Daughter Mean"	Ruth Brown	"(Mama) He Treats Your Daughter Mean"	Ruth Brown	
April 11	"(Mama) He Treats Your Daughter Mean"	Ruth Brown	"(Mama) He Treats Your Daughter Mean"	Ruth Brown	
April 18	"(Mama) He Treats Your Daughter Mean"	Ruth Brown	"Hound Dog"	Willie Mae "Big Mama" Thornton	
April 25	"Hound Dog"	Willie Mae "Big Mama" Thornton	"Hound Dog"	Willie Mae "Big Mama" Thornton	
May 2	"Hound Dog"	Willie Mae "Big Mama" Thornton	"Hound Dog"	Willie Mae "Big Mama" Thornton	
May 9	"Hound Dog"	Willie Mae "Big Mama" Thornton	"Hound Dog"	Willie Mae "Big Mama" Thornton	
May 16	"Hound Dog"	Willie Mae "Big Mama" Thornton	"Hound Dog"	Willie Mae "Big Mama" Thornton	
May 23	"Hound Dog"	Willie Mae "Big Mama" Thornton	"Hound Dog"	Willie Mae "Big Mama" Thornton	
May 30	"I'm Mad"	Willie Mabon and his Combo	"Hound Dog"	Willie Mae "Big Mama" Thornton	
June 6	"I'm Mad"	Willie Mabon and his Combo	"Hound Dog"	Willie Mae "Big Mama" Thornton	
June 13	"Help Me Somebody"	The "5" Royales	"Help Me Somebody"	The "5" Royales	
June 20	"Help Me Somebody"	The "5" Royales	"Help Me Somebody"	The "5" Royales	
June 27	"Help Me Somebody"	The "5" Royales	"Help Me Somebody"	The "5" Royales	
July 4	"Please Love Me"	B.B. King	"Help Me Somebody"	The "5" Royales	
July 11	"Help Me Somebody"	The "5" Royales	"Help Me Somebody"	The "5" Royales	
July 18	"The Clock"	Johnny Ace	"Help Me Somebody"	The "5" Royales	
July 25	"Please Love Me"	B.B. King	"The Clock"	Johnny Ace	
August 1	"The Clock"	Johnny Ace	"The Clock"	Johnny Ace	
August 8	"The Clock"	Johnny Ace	"The Clock"	Johnny Ace	
August 15	"The Clock"	Johnny Ace	"The Clock"	Johnny Ace	
August 22	"The Clock"	Johnny Ace	"Crying in the Chapel"	The Orioles	
August 29	"Crying in the Chapel"	The Orioles	"Crying in the Chapel"	The Orioles	
September 5	"Crying in the Chapel"	The Orioles	"Crying in the Chapel"	The Orioles	
September 12	"Crying in the Chapel"	The Orioles	"Crying in the Chapel"	The Orioles	
September 19	"Shake a Hand"	Faye Adams	"Shake a Hand"	Faye Adams	
September 26	"Shake a Hand"	Faye Adams	"Shake a Hand"	Faye Adams	
October 3	"Shake a Hand"	Faye Adams	"Shake a Hand"	Faye Adams	
October 10	"Crying in the Chapel"	The Orioles	"Shake a Hand"	Faye Adams	
October 17^{[a]}	"Crying in the Chapel"	The Orioles	"Shake a Hand"	Faye Adams	
October 17^{[a]}	"Shake a Hand"	Faye Adams	"Shake a Hand"	Faye Adams	
October 24	"Shake a Hand"	Faye Adams	"Shake a Hand"	Faye Adams	
October 31	"Shake a Hand"	Faye Adams	"Shake a Hand"	Faye Adams	
November 7	"Shake a Hand"	Faye Adams	"Shake a Hand"	Faye Adams	
November 14	"Shake a Hand"	Faye Adams	"Shake a Hand"	Faye Adams	
November 21	"Money Honey"	Clyde McPhatter and the Drifters	"Money Honey"	Clyde McPhatter and the Drifters	
November 28	"Shake a Hand"	Faye Adams	"Money Honey"	Clyde McPhatter and the Drifters	
December 5^{[a]}	"Shake a Hand"	Faye Adams	"Money Honey"	Clyde McPhatter and the Drifters	
December 5^{[a]}	"Honey Hush"	Big Joe Turner	"Money Honey"	Clyde McPhatter and the Drifters	
December 12	"Honey Hush"	Big Joe Turner	"Money Honey"	Clyde McPhatter and the Drifters	
December 19	"Honey Hush"	Big Joe Turner	"Money Honey"	Clyde McPhatter and the Drifters	
December 26	"Honey Hush"	Big Joe Turner	"Money Honey"	Clyde McPhatter and the Drifters	

a. Two songs tied for number one on the juke box chart in this issue.
