= Top R&B/Hip-Hop Albums =

US album chart published by Billboard

Top R&B/Hip-Hop Albums is a music chart published weekly by Billboard magazine that ranks R&B and hip-hop albums based on sales in the United States and is compiled by Luminate. The chart debuted as Hot R&B LPs in the issue dated January 30, 1965, in an effort by the magazine to further expand into the field of rhythm and blues music. It then went through several name changes, being known as Soul LPs in the 1970s and Top Black Albums in the 1980s, before returning to the R&B identification in 1990 and affixing a hip hop designation in 1999 to reflect the latter's growing sales and relationship to R&B during the decade.

From 1965 through 2009, the chart was compiled based on reported sales at a core panel of stores with a "higher-than-average volume" of R&B and/or hip-hop album sales to monitor buying trends of the African-American community. This panel included more independent and smaller chain stores compared to the high percentage of mass merchants that account for overall album sales. The core panel of stores continued to be monitored with the advent of SoundScan technology in the early 1990s but was dissolved at the end of 2009 when the methodology of the chart changed to "recap overall album sales of current R&B/hip-hop titles."

== Chart name history ==
The chart debuted on January 30, 1965, as the Hot R&B LP's. On August 23, 1969, Billboard renamed both singles and albums contingents of the R&B charts as Soul charts; the albums chart was first called Best Selling Soul LP's and then from July 14, 1973, simply Soul LP's. (Note: The apostrophe in "LP's" was dropped beginning on August 10, 1974.)

On June 26, 1982, the singles and album charts were renamed again as Black Singles and Black LPs respectively. The change followed internal debate within Billboard about how to better reflect the growing stylistic range of music made and consumed by Black audiences. Nelson George called the change "long overdue", noting that Black artists had been making pop music beyond soul since the early 1970s. It was also part of a longer evolution in Billboard’s terminology for Black music, which had previously included terms like "Race Records", which was first used in the 1920s by OKeh Records to market Mamie Smith's "Crazy Blues". With Billboard's overhaul of its charts on October 20, 1984, the chart became Top Black Albums.

On October 27, 1990, the charts returned to the R&B designation (Top R&B Albums, Hot R&B Singles). On December 11, 1999, Billboard renamed them again as Top R&B/Hip-Hop Albums and Hot R&B/Hip-Hop Singles & Tracks, in an effort to recognize the growing sales of hip hop music and the genre's influential relationship to contemporary R&B. The phrase "hip-hop" was chosen over "rap" because the former was considered more inclusive and better reflected the genre's broader cultural influence. Billboard highlighted Lauryn Hill as a defining example of this shift, stating that she was "as accomplished a singer as she is a rapper" and "a prime example of an act who would more appropriately be described as a hip-hop artist than a rapper". The change also acknowledged that many of the top-charting rap tracks at the time had origins in R&B traditions, further blurring the genre lines.

== Achievements ==
Artists with the most number-one albums
Artist	No. of #1 albums	Source
The Temptations	17	
Drake	17	
Future	16	
Jay-Z	14	
Kanye West	13	
R. Kelly	12	

Album with the most weeks in the top ten
Weeks	Album	Artist
100	My Turn	Lil Baby
89	Hollywood's Bleeding	Post Malone
77	Stoney	Post Malone
77	beerbongs & bentleys	Post Malone
76	Thriller	Michael Jackson
70	Shoot for the Stars, Aim for the Moon	Pop Smoke
64	Whitney Houston	Whitney Houston
63	The E.N.D.	Black Eyed Peas
61	After Hours	The Weeknd
59	The Heist	Macklemore & Ryan Lewis

Albums with the most weeks on the chart
Weeks	Album	Artist
700	Good Kid, M.A.A.D City	Kendrick Lamar
362	Take Care	Drake
342	Curtain Call: The Hits	Eminem
327	Greatest Hits	Tupac Shakur
319	2014 Forest Hills Drive	J. Cole
266	Goodbye & Good Riddance	Juice Wrld
263	Damn	Kendrick Lamar
259	beerbongs & bentleys	Post Malone

== Top Rap Albums ==
Billboard began the Top Rap Albums chart on the weekend of June 26, 2004, although its first publication on print commenced on the week of November 20, 2004. Pop Smoke's posthumous debut, Shoot for the Stars, Aim for the Moon holds the record of most weeks at number one on the chart with twenty non-consecutive weeks.

=== Albums with the most weeks at number one ===
Weeks	Album	Artist	Source
20	Shoot for the Stars, Aim for the Moon	Pop Smoke	
19	Recovery	Eminem	
18	Heroes & Villains	Metro Boomin	
16	Take Care	Drake	
14	The Marshall Mathers LP 2	Eminem	
14	GNX	Kendrick Lamar	
13	Paper Trail	T.I.	
13	The Heist	Macklemore & Ryan Lewis	
13	Certified Lover Boy	Drake	
11	Damn	Kendrick Lamar	
11	For All the Dogs	Drake	

=== Artists with the most number-one albums ===
No. of albums	Artist	Source
16	Future	
15	Drake	
11	Kanye West	
10	Lil Wayne	
8	Tupac	
7	Eminem	
7	Jay-Z	
7	Metro Boomin	
6	Kendrick Lamar	
6	Travis Scott	

== Works cited ==
- Whitburn, Joel (2000). Top R&B Albums: 1965–1998. Record Research. ISBN 978-0-89820-134-5
