= Monkey Hips and Rice: The "5" Royales Anthology =

Compilation album by the "5" Royales
- Released: 1994
- Genres: R&B, soul, rock and roll
- Label: Rhino
- Producers: Gary Stewart, James Austin

The "5" Royales chronology
Sing Laundromat Blues (1987)	Monkey Hips and Rice: The "5" Royales Anthology (1994)	The Apollo Sessions (1995)

Monkey Hips and Rice: The "5" Royales Anthology is a compilation album by the American musical group the "5" Royales, released in 1994. It collects songs from the group's King and Apollo years. The only two-disc title in Rhino Records' King Master Series, it was released the same year that group members Eugene Tanner and Obadiah Carter died.

Robert Palmer, while working on the 1995 WGBH/BBC Rock & Roll television series, listed the compilation as one of ten essential documents of "Classic Rock & Roll".

== Production ==
The compilation was produced by Gary Stewart and James Austin. The album liner notes were penned by Ed Ward. Monkey Hips and Rice includes a track from the Royal Suns Quintet, an earlier lineup of the group.

== Critical reception ==
Professional ratings
Review scores
Source	Rating
AllMusic	5/5 stars
Robert Christgau	A
The Encyclopedia of Popular Music	4/5 stars
MusicHound Rock: The Essential Album Guide	5/5 stars
(The New) Rolling Stone Album Guide	4.5/5 stars

Robert Christgau wrote that "Lowman Pauling's hard-touring sextet did it all, laughs included, and although Pauling's thought-through songwriting and groundbreaking guitar made him the auteur, singer Johnny Tanner deserves more grafs than he'll ever get in the prehistory of soul." The Los Angeles Times thought that "there is some less-than immortal novelty fare among the album's 41 songs—such as the forced double-entendre 'Laundromat Blues'—but most are real gems." The Washington Post noted that Pauling "pioneered the use of single-note, distorted guitar fills and helped fuse gospel and blues into soul."

AllMusic called the collection "impeccable," writing that the group "take off toward the end of the first disc, stretching through the second disc, with a stretch of invigorating music that is among the greatest R&B ever recorded." (The New) Rolling Stone Album Guide deemed the compilation's selections "brilliantly chosen," and lamented that it was out of print. Peter Guralnick labeled it "a stone classic."

== Track listing ==
Disc one
No.	Title	Length
1.	"Let Nothing Separate Me"
2.	"Courage to Love"
3.	"Baby Don't Do It"
4.	"Help Me Somebody"
5.	"Crazy, Crazy, Crazy"
6.	"Laundromat Blues"
7.	"Too Much Lovin'"
8.	"All Righty!"
9.	"I Do"
10.	"I Like It Like That"
11.	"Let Me Come Back Home"
12.	"Monkey Hips and Rice"
13.	"School Girl"
14.	"Mohawk Squaw"
15.	"When I Get Like This"
16.	"Women About to Make Me Go Crazy"
17.	"Someone Made You for Me"
18.	"Right Around the Corner"
19.	"When You Walked Through the Door"
20.	"Come On and Save Me"
21.	"Get Something Out of It"

Disc two
No.	Title	Length
1.	"Just as I Am"
2.	"Thirty Second Lover"
3.	"Tears of Joy"
4.	"Think"
5.	"I'd Better Make a Move"
6.	"Say It"
7.	"Messin' Up"
8.	"Don't Be Ashamed"
9.	"Dedicated to the One I Love"
10.	"Do the Cha Cha Cherry"
11.	"Double or Nothing"
12.	"Tell the Truth"
13.	"The Slummer the Slum"
14.	"The Real Thing"
15.	"I Know It's Hard but It's Fair"
16.	"Miracle of Love"
17.	"Wonder Where Your Love Has Gone"
18.	"Tell Me You Care"
19.	"My Sugar Sugar"
20.	"Help Me Somebody"
