= List of Billboard number-one R&B songs of 1952 =

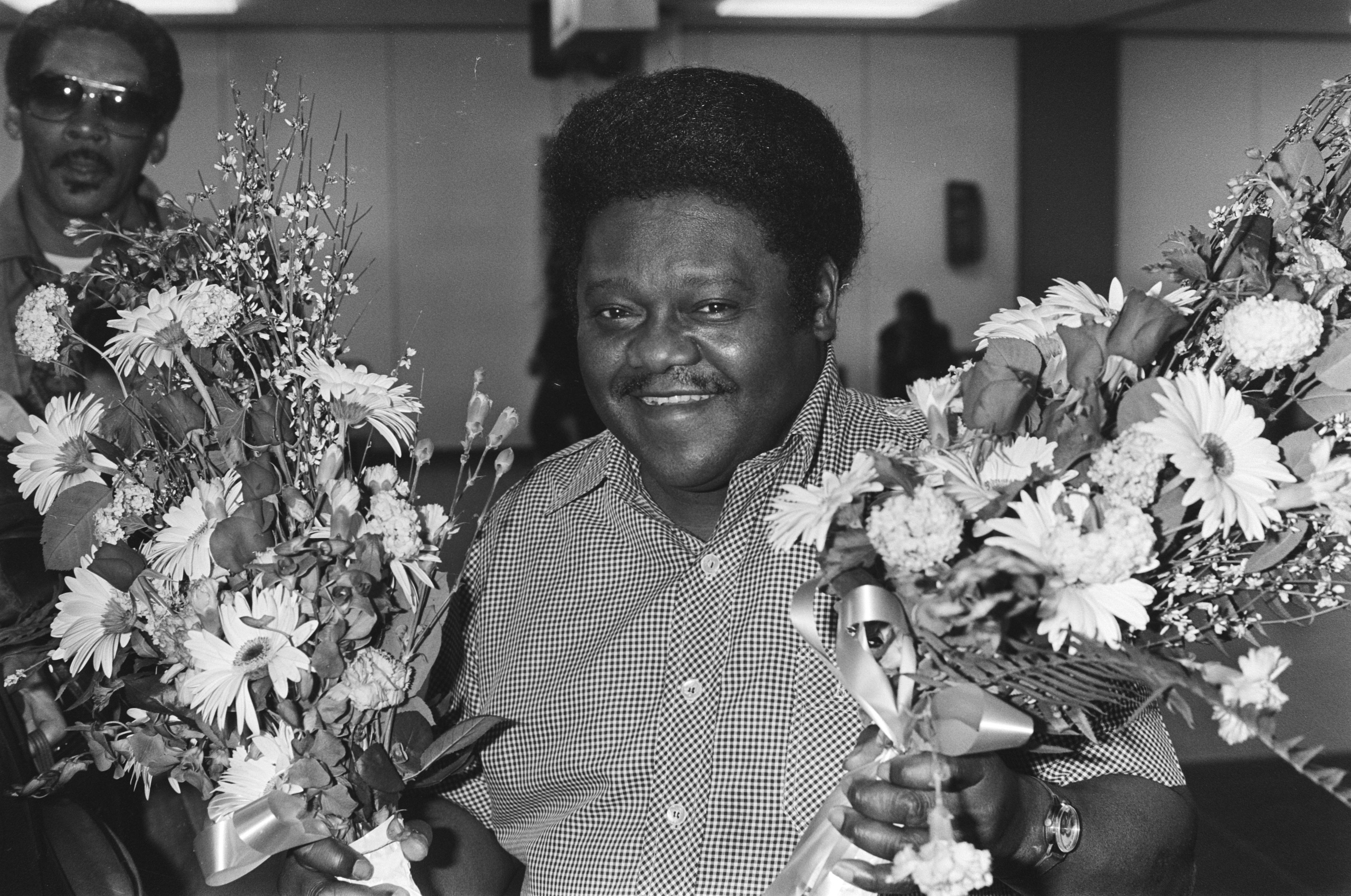
"Goin' Home" was the first number one for Fats Domino.

In 1952, Billboard magazine published National Best Sellers and Most Played in Juke Boxes, two charts covering the top-performing songs in the United States in rhythm and blues and related African-American-oriented music genres. These charts, published as Best Selling Retail Rhythm & Blues Records and Most Played Juke Box Rhythm & Blues Records through the issue dated November 8, were based on sales in stores and plays in jukeboxes, respectively. They are considered part of the lineage of the magazine's multimetric R&B chart launched in 1958, which since 2005 has been published under the title Hot R&B/Hip-Hop Songs.

In the issue of Billboard dated January 5, the Clovers were at number one on the juke box chart with "Fool, Fool, Fool" and Earl Bostic and his Orchestra were atop the best sellers listing with "Flamingo", both tracks retaining the position from the last issue of 1951. The following week both songs were displaced from number one, as the Griffin Brothers Orchestra moved into the top spot on the juke box chart with "Weepin' & Cryin'" and "Cry" by Johnnie Ray and the Four Lads reached number one on the best sellers listing. Both songs were the only R&B chart-topper achieved by their respective performers. The year's longest unbroken run at number one on the juke box chart was seven weeks, achieved by Jimmy Forrest in March and April with "Night Train", but the longest-running chart-topper overall was "Juke" by Little Walter, which spent eight non-consecutive weeks in the top spot. On the best sellers listing, two songs each spent seven consecutive weeks in the top spot: "5–10–15 Hours" by Ruth Brown and "My Song" by Johnny Ace. The latter song spent nine weeks at number one in total, making it the longest-running number one of the year on that chart. Despite its sales success, Ace's song failed to top the juke box chart, peaking at number 2.

In June, Fats Domino gained his first number one when he topped the best sellers list for a single week with "Goin' Home". Domino was the most successful black rock & roll artist of the 1950s and achieved a string of pop and R&B successes until the mid-1960s. In recognition of this, he was included in the inaugural class of inductees to the Rock and Roll Hall of Fame in 1986. Domino also played on the song "Lawdy Miss Clawdy", which gave another future Rock and Roll Hall of Famer, Lloyd Price, his first number one in July. The song is considered to have been a significant early influence on the emerging rock and roll genre and was covered by Elvis Presley in 1956. The year's final number one on the juke box chart was "Five Long Years" by Eddie Boyd and the last chart-topper on the best sellers listing was "I Don't Know" by Willie Mabon and his Combo. In both cases it was the artist's first charting song.

== Chart history ==
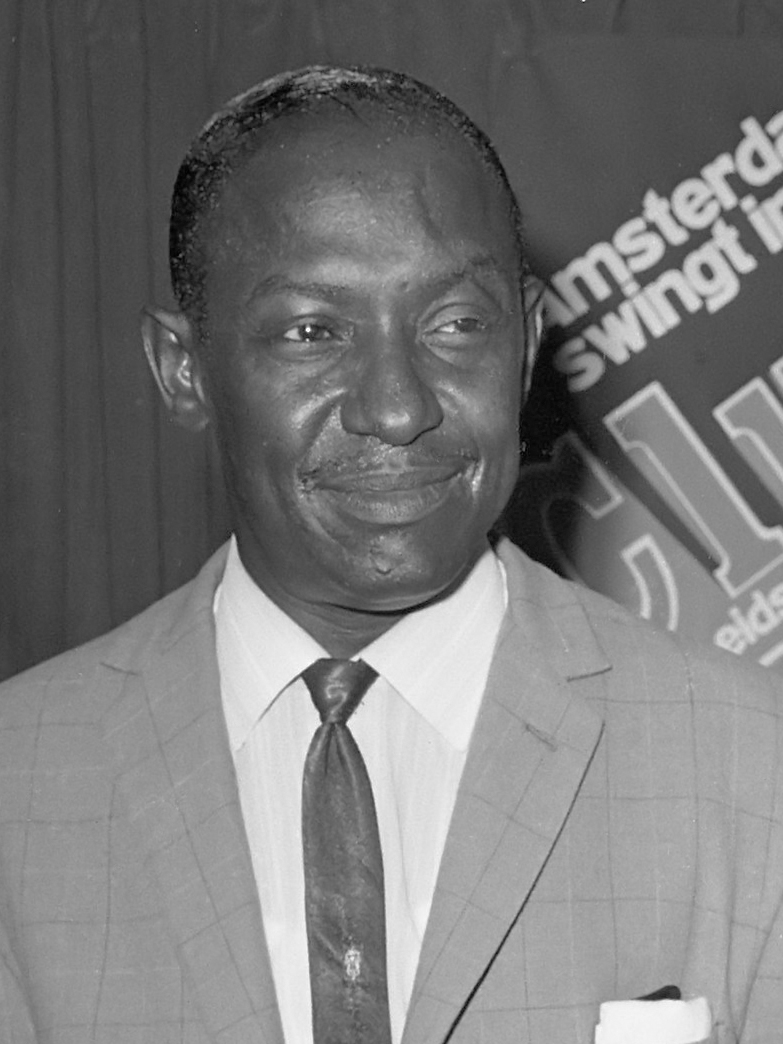
Eddie Boyd topped both charts with "Five Long Years".

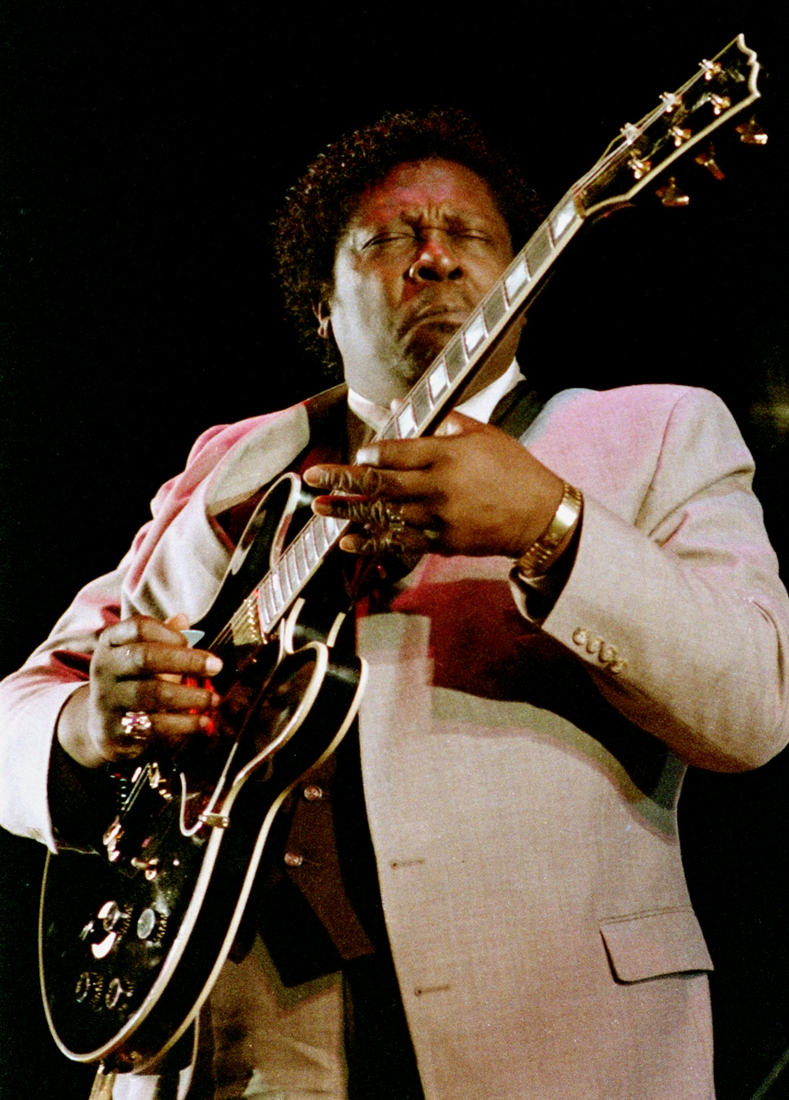
B.B. King had two number ones in 1952.

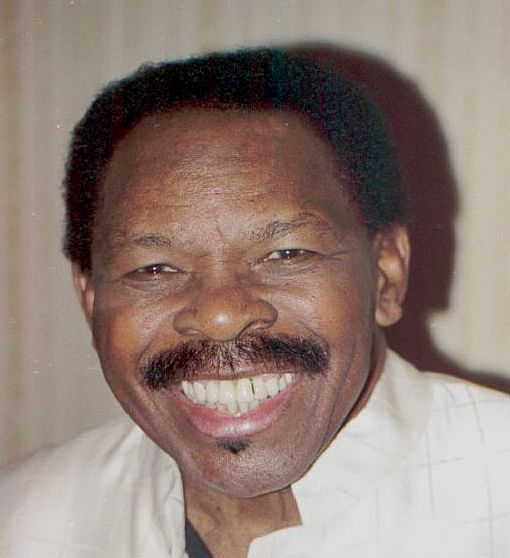
Lloyd Price (pictured in later life) topped both charts with "Lawdy Miss Clawdy".

Chart history
| Issue date | Juke Box | | Best Sellers | | Ref. |
| Issue date | Title | Artist(s) | Title | Artist(s) | Ref. |
|---|---|---|---|---|---|
| January 5 | "Fool, Fool, Fool" | The Clovers | "Flamingo" | Earl Bostic and his Orchestra | |
| January 12 | "Weepin' & Cryin'" | Griffin Brothers Orchestra | "Cry" | Johnnie Ray and the Four Lads | |
| January 19 | "Weepin' & Cryin'" | Griffin Brothers Orchestra | "Fool, Fool, Fool" | The Clovers | |
| January 26 | "Weepin' & Cryin'" | Griffin Brothers Orchestra | "Flamingo" | Earl Bostic and his Orchestra | |
| February 2 | "3 O'Clock Blues" | B.B. King | "Flamingo" | Earl Bostic and his Orchestra | |
| February 9 | "Cry" | Johnnie Ray and the Four Lads | "3 O'Clock Blues" | B.B. King | |
| February 16 | "3 O'Clock Blues" | B.B. King | "3 O'Clock Blues" | B.B. King | |
| February 23 | "3 O'Clock Blues" | B.B. King | "3 O'Clock Blues" | B.B. King | |
| March 1 | "3 O'Clock Blues" | B.B. King | "3 O'Clock Blues" | B.B. King | |
| March 8 | "3 O'Clock Blues" | B.B. King | "3 O'Clock Blues" | B.B. King | |
| March 15 | "Night Train" | Jimmy Forrest | "Booted" | Roscoe Gordon | |
| March 22 | "Night Train" | Jimmy Forrest | "Night Train" | Jimmy Forrest | |
| March 29 | "Night Train" | Jimmy Forrest | "Night Train" | Jimmy Forrest | |
| April 5 | "Night Train" | Jimmy Forrest | "Night Train" | Jimmy Forrest | |
| April 12 | "Night Train" | Jimmy Forrest | "Night Train" | Jimmy Forrest | |
| April 19 | "Night Train" | Jimmy Forrest | "Night Train" | Jimmy Forrest | |
| April 26 | "Night Train" | Jimmy Forrest | "Night Train" | Jimmy Forrest | |
| May 3 | "5–10–15 Hours" | Ruth Brown | "5–10–15 Hours" | Ruth Brown | |
| May 10 | "5–10–15 Hours" | Ruth Brown | "5–10–15 Hours" | Ruth Brown | |
| May 17 | "5–10–15 Hours" | Ruth Brown | "5–10–15 Hours" | Ruth Brown | |
| May 24 | "5–10–15 Hours" | Ruth Brown | "5–10–15 Hours" | Ruth Brown | |
| May 31 | "5–10–15 Hours" | Ruth Brown | "5–10–15 Hours" | Ruth Brown | |
| June 7 | "5–10–15 Hours" | Ruth Brown | "5–10–15 Hours" | Ruth Brown | |
| June 14 | "Have Mercy Baby" | The Dominoes | "5–10–15 Hours" | Ruth Brown | |
| June 21 | "Have Mercy Baby" | The Dominoes | "Goin' Home" | Fats Domino | |
| June 28 | "Have Mercy Baby" | The Dominoes | "Have Mercy Baby" | The Dominoes | |
| July 5 | "Have Mercy Baby" | The Dominoes | "Have Mercy Baby" | The Dominoes | |
| July 12 | "Lawdy Miss Clawdy" | Lloyd Price | "Have Mercy Baby" | The Dominoes | |
| July 19 | "Lawdy Miss Clawdy" | Lloyd Price | "Have Mercy Baby" | The Dominoes | |
| July 26 | "Lawdy Miss Clawdy" | Lloyd Price | "Have Mercy Baby" | The Dominoes | |
| August 2^{[a]} | "Lawdy Miss Clawdy" | Lloyd Price | "Have Mercy Baby" | The Dominoes | |
| August 2^{[a]} | "Lawdy Miss Clawdy" | Lloyd Price | "Lawdy Miss Clawdy" | Lloyd Price | |
| August 9 | "Lawdy Miss Clawdy" | Lloyd Price | "Lawdy Miss Clawdy" | Lloyd Price | |
| August 16 | "Lawdy Miss Clawdy" | Lloyd Price | "Lawdy Miss Clawdy" | Lloyd Price | |
| August 23 | "Mary Jo" | The Four Blazes | "Lawdy Miss Clawdy" | Lloyd Price | |
| August 30 | "Mary Jo" | The Four Blazes | "Lawdy Miss Clawdy" | Lloyd Price | |
| September 6^{[a]} | "Have Mercy Baby" | The Dominoes | "Have Mercy Baby" | The Dominoes | |
| September 6^{[a]} | "Have Mercy Baby" | The Dominoes | "Ting-A-Ling" | The Clovers | |
| September 13 | "Mary Jo" | The Four Blazes | "Lawdy Miss Clawdy" | Lloyd Price | |
| September 20 | "Ting-A-Ling" | The Clovers | "Lawdy Miss Clawdy" | Lloyd Price | |
| September 27 | "Juke" | Little Walter | "My Song" | Johnny Ace | |
| October 4 | "Juke" | Little Walter | "My Song" | Johnny Ace | |
| October 11 | "Juke" | Little Walter | "My Song" | Johnny Ace | |
| October 18 | "Juke" | Little Walter | "My Song" | Johnny Ace | |
| October 25 | "Juke" | Little Walter | "My Song" | Johnny Ace | |
| November 1 | "Juke" | Little Walter | "My Song" | Johnny Ace | |
| November 8^{[a]} | "Five Long Years" | Eddie Boyd | "My Song" | Johnny Ace | |
| November 8^{[a]} | "Five Long Years" | Eddie Boyd | "You Know I Love You" | B.B. King | |
| November 15 | "Five Long Years" | Eddie Boyd | "My Song" | Johnny Ace | |
| November 22 | "Five Long Years" | Eddie Boyd | "My Song" | Johnny Ace | |
| November 29 | "Five Long Years" | Eddie Boyd | "You Know I Love You" | B.B. King | |
| December 6 | "Five Long Years" | Eddie Boyd | "Juke" | Little Walter | |
| December 13 | "Juke" | Little Walter | "Five Long Years" | Eddie Boyd | |
| December 20 | "Juke" | Little Walter | "Five Long Years" | Eddie Boyd | |
| December 27 | "Five Long Years" | Eddie Boyd | "I Don't Know" | Willie Mabon and his Combo | |

a. Two songs tied for number one on the best sellers chart in this issue.
