= Lists of Billboard number-one rhythm and blues hits =

Linked here are Billboard magazine's number-one rhythm and blues hits. The Billboard R&B chart is today known as the Hot R&B/Hip-Hop Songs chart.

== History ==
From May 22, 1948 to October 13, 1958, multiple charts were published, which explains the overlap in the dates of the charts. Previously, Harlem Hit Parade, created in 1942, had listed the “most popular records in Harlem" and another chart, "Race Records Juke Box", was created in 1945; in 1948, a parallel chart was added: "Race Record Best Sellers". (The term "race music" originally came from within the black community, but was deemed offensive in the postwar world.) All of these were renamed as R&B charts in 1949. A third, "Jockeys" chart, based on radio airplay, was introduced in 1955, and a unified chart was only introduced in 1958. Because of the existence of multiple charts, some dates had more than one number-one song during the week.

== Gap in the chart ==
From November 30, 1963 to January 23, 1965 there was no Billboard R&B singles chart. Some publications have used Cashbox magazine's stats in their place. No specific reason has ever been given as to why Billboard ceased releasing R&B charts, but the prevailing wisdom is that the chart methodology used was being questioned, since more and more white acts were reaching number-one on the R&B chart. According to researcher Joel Whitburn, "there was so much crossover of titles between the R&B and pop singles (Hot 100) charts that Billboard considered the charts to be too similar. This does not mean that R&B artists stopped turning out hits. After all, it was during this 14-month period that Motown established itself as an R&B institution."

== Chart names ==
- Harlem Hit Parade – 1942 to February 10, 1945
- Juke Box Race Records – February 17, 1945 to June 17, 1957
- Billboard's "Best Sellers" – May 22, 1948 to October 13, 1958
- Rhythm & Blues – June 25, 1949 to November 23, 1963
- Billboard's "Jockeys" – January 22, 1955 to October 13, 1958
- Hot R&B – October 20, 1958 to November 23, 1963. Reinstated January 30, 1965 and continued under that name until the week ending August 16, 1969
- Best Selling Soul Singles – August 23, 1969 to July 7, 1973
- Hot Soul Singles – July 14, 1973 to June 19, 1982
- Hot Black Singles – June 26, 1982 to October 1990
- Hot R&B Singles – October 1990 to January 1999
- Hot R&B Singles & Tracks – January 1999 to December 1999
- Hot R&B/Hip-Hop Singles & Tracks – December 1999 to April 2005
- Hot R&B/Hip-Hop Songs – April 2005 to present

== List ==
- 1942
- 1943
- 1944
- 1945
- 1946
- 1947
- 1948
- 1949
- 1950
- 1951
- 1952
- 1953
- 1954
- 1955
- 1956
- 1957
- 1958
- 1959
- 1960
- 1961
- 1962
- 1963
- 1964
- 1965
- 1966
- 1967
- 1968
- 1969
- 1970
- 1971
- 1972
- 1973
- 1974
- 1975
- 1976
- 1977
- 1978
- 1979
- 1980
- 1981
- 1982
- 1983
- 1984
- 1985
- 1986
- 1987
- 1988
- 1989
- 1990
- 1991
- 1992
- 1993
- 1994
- 1995
- 1996
- 1997
- 1998
- 1999
- 2000
- 2001
- 2002
- 2003
- 2004
- 2005
- 2006
- 2007
- 2008
- 2009
- 2010
- 2011
- 2012
- 2013
- 2014
- 2015
- 2016
- 2017
- 2018
- 2019
- 2020
- 2021
- 2022
- 2023
- 2024
- 2025
- 2026
