= I'm Mad =

I'm Mad may refer to:

- "I'm Mad" (song), a song written by Willie Mabon
- "I'm Mad", a song by Bill Wyman's Rhythm Kings from the album Struttin' Our Stuff
- "I'm Mad", a song by EPMD from the album Business as Usual
- "I'm Mad", a song by the Presidents of the United States of America from the album Freaked Out and Small
- "I'm Mad", a song by Slaughter and the Dogs from the album Do It Dog Style
- "I'm Mad", a song by Slade from the album Return to Base
- I'm Mad, a 1994 Animaniacs short film
