= Race record =

78-rpm phonograph records marketed to African Americans between the 1920s and 1940s

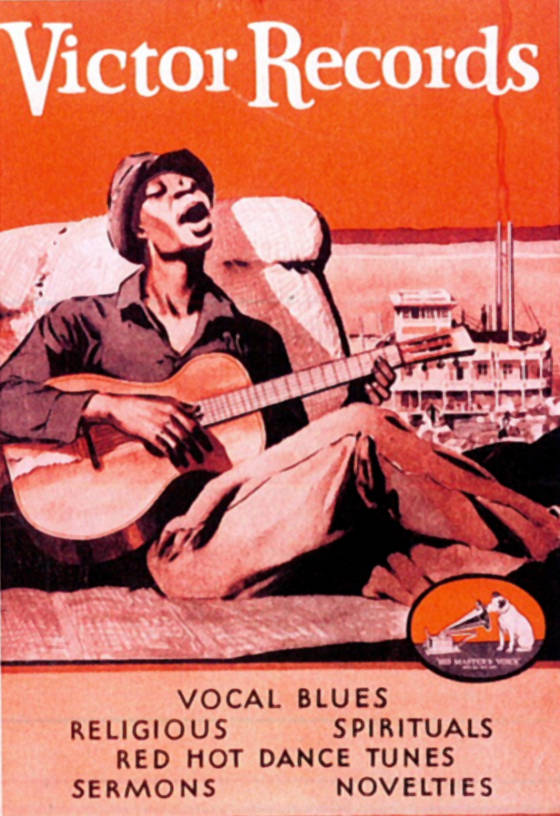
The cover of race records catalogue of Victor Talking Machine Company

Race records is a term for 78-rpm phonograph records marketed to African Americans between the 1920s and 1940s. They primarily contained race music, comprising various African-American musical genres, blues, jazz, and gospel music, rhythm and blues and also comedy. These records were, at the time, the majority of commercial recordings of African American artists in the U.S., and few African American artists were marketed to white audiences. Race records were marketed by Okeh Records, Emerson Records, Vocalion Records, Victor Talking Machine Company, Paramount Records, and several other companies. From 1945 to 1949 American music industry magazine The Billboard published a Race Records music chart, a precursor to the Hot R&B/Hip-Hop Songs chart of today.

== History ==
Before the rise of the record industry in America, the cost of phonographs prevented most African Americans from listening to recorded music. At the turn of the twentieth century, the cost of listening to music went down, providing a majority of Americans with the ability to afford records. The primary purpose of records was to increase sales of record players, which were most commonly distributed in furniture stores. The stores white and black people shopped at were separate due to segregation, and the type of music available to white and black people differed.

Mainstream records during the 1890s and the first two decades of the 1900s were mainly made by and targeted toward white, middle-class, and urban Americans. There were some exceptions, including George W. Johnson, a whistler who is widely believed to be the first black artist ever to record commercially, in 1890. Broadway stars Bert Williams and George Walker recorded for Victor Talking Machine Company in 1901, followed by black artists employed by other companies. Yet, the African American artists that major record companies hired before the 1920s were not properly compensated or acknowledged. This was because contracts were given to black artists on the basis of a single record, so their future opportunities were not guaranteed.

African-American culture greatly influenced the popular media that white Americans consumed in the 1900s. Still, there were not any primarily black genres of music sold in early records. Perry Bradford, a famous black composer, sparked a transition that displayed the potential for African American artists. Bradford persuaded the white executive of Okeh Records, Fred Hager, to record Mamie Smith, a black artist who did not fit the mold of popular white music. In 1920, Smith created her "Crazy Blues"/"It's Right Here for You" recording, which sold 75,000 copies to a majority-black audience in the first month. Okeh did not anticipate these sales and attempted to recreate their success by recruiting more black blues singers. Other big companies sought to profit from this new trend of race records. Columbia Records was the first to follow Okeh into the race records industry in 1921, while Paramount Records began selling race records in 1922 and Vocalion entered in the mid-1920s.

== Terminology ==
The term "race records" was coined in 1922 by Okeh Records. Such records were labeled "race records" in reference to their marketing to African Americans, but white Americans gradually began to purchase such records as well. In the 16 October 1920 issue of the Chicago Defender, an African-American newspaper, an advertisement for Okeh Records identified Mamie Smith as "Our Race Artist". Most of the major recording companies issued "race" series of records from the mid-1920s to the 1940s.

In hindsight, the term race record may seem derogatory; in the early 20th century, however, the African-American press routinely used the term the Race to refer to African Americans as a whole and race man or race woman to refer to an African-American individual who showed pride in and support for African-American people and culture.

Billboard began publishing charts of hit songs in 1940. Two years later, the company's list of songs popular among African Americans was created: Harlem Hit Parade. It listed the “most popular records in Harlem" and began to replace the term "race music" in the industry. The Harlem concept was replaced by R&B chart listings in June 1949.

The term "rhythm and blues" fully replaced the term "race music".

== Marketing ==
Marketing race records was especially important in the late 1920s, when the radio brought competition to the record industry. To maximize exposure, record labels advertised in catalogs, brochures, and newspapers popular among African Americans, like the Chicago Defender. They carefully implemented words and images that would draw in their targeted audience. Race records ads frequently reminded readers of their shared experience, claiming the music could help African Americans who moved to the North stay connected with their Southern roots.

Companies like Okeh and Paramount enforced their objectives in the 1920s by sending field scouts to Southern states to record black artists in a one-time deal. Scouts neglected the aspirations of many singers to continue working with their companies. Field recordings were presented to the public as chance encounters to seem more genuine, yet they typically were arranged.

Perspectives on the reason white record companies invested in marketing race records vary, with some claiming it was "for the purpose of exploiting markets and expanding the capital of producers." Advocates of this philosophy emphasize the control that the companies had on the type and form of songs that artists could create. Another perspective points to evidence such as the fact that "race records were distinguished by numerical series… in effect, segregated lists", to support the claim that white-owned companies aimed to maintain the racial divisions in society through race records. Media companies even implemented racial stereotypes in advertising to invoke black sentiments and sell more records. Others regard the investments as being motivated simply by profit, namely by the low cost of production resulting from the easy exploitation of black writers and musicians, combined with the ease of distribution to a highly targeted class of consumers who have little access to a fully competitive marketplace.

== Black Swan Records ==
The control of white owned music companies was tested in the 1920s, when Black Swan Records was founded in 1921 by the African American businessman Harry Pace. Black Swan was formed to integrate the black community into a primarily white music industry, issuing around five hundred race records per year. The creation of this company brought widespread support for race records from the African American community. However some white companies in the music industry were strongly against Black Swan and threatened the company on multiple occasions.

Pace not only issued jazz, blues, and gospel records, but he put out race records that deviated from popular African American categories. These genres included classical, opera, and spirituals, chosen by Pace to encourage the advancement of African American culture. He intended the company to provide an economic ideal for African Americans to strive towards, proving that they could overcome social barriers and be successful. Hence, Black Swan paid fair wages and allowed artists to showcase their race records using their real names. Pace urged record companies owned by white individuals to recognize the demands of African Americans and increase the flow of race records in the future. Black Swan was eventually purchased by Paramount Records in 1924.

== Decline ==
The Great Depression destroyed the race record market, leaving most African American musicians jobless. Almost every major music company removed race records from their catalogs as the country turned to the radio. Black listenership for the radio consistently stayed below ten percent of the total black population during this time, as the music they enjoyed did not get airtime. The exclusion of black artists on the radio was further cemented when commercial networks like NBC and CBS started to hire white singers to cover black music. It was not until after World War II that rhythm and blues, a term spanning most sub-genres of race records, gained prevalence on the radio.

It has been noted that "whole areas of black vocal tradition have been overlooked, or at best have received a few tangential references." Though not studied comprehensively, race records have been preserved. Publications like Dixon and Godrich's Blues and Gospel Records 1902-1943 list the names of race records that were commercially recorded and recorded in the field.

== Transition to rhythm and blues ==
Billboard published a Race Records chart between 1945 and 1949, initially covering juke box plays and from 1948 also covering sales. This was a revised version of the Harlem Hit Parade chart, which it had introduced in 1942.

In June 1949, at the suggestion of Billboard journalist Jerry Wexler, the magazine changed the name of the chart to Rhythm & Blues Records. Wexler wrote, "'Race' was a common term then, a self-referral used by blacks...On the other hand, 'Race Records' didn't sit well...I came up with a handle I thought suited the music well – 'rhythm and blues.'... [It was] a label more appropriate to more enlightened times." The chart has since undergone further name changes, becoming the Soul chart in August 1969, and the Black chart in June 1982.

== See also ==
- African American music
- Cover versions
- Hot R&B/Hip-Hop Songs, for a history of the Billboard R&B record chart, known as the Race Records chart from February 1945 to June 1949
- List of number-one rhythm and blues hits (United States) (Billboard, 1942–1959)
- Race film
