= Frederick W. Hager =

American musician, composer, and music director (1874–1958)

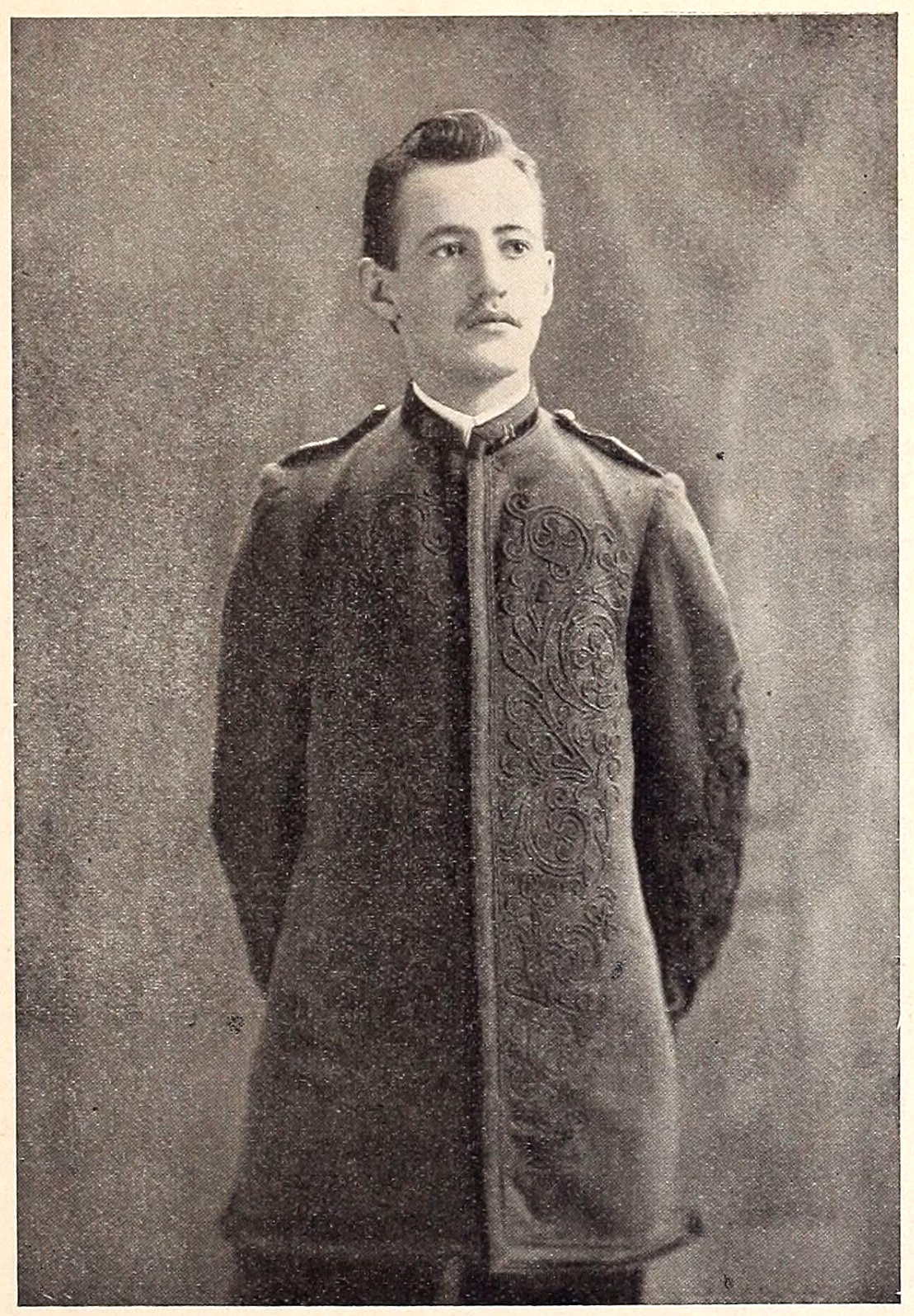

Background information
- Born: Frederick Wallace Haga; December 31, 1874; New Milford, PA
- Died: March 3, 1958 (aged 83) Dunedin, FL
- Occupations: Violinist; bandleader; composer; music director
- Years active: 1895-1923
- Labels: Zonophone, Columbia, OKeh
- Formerly of: Hager's Orchestra

Frederick W. Hager (December 31, 1874 - March 3, 1958) was an American musician, recording artist, composer, and music director active between 1895 and 1923.

== Biography ==
=== Early life and recording and bandleader ===
Hager was born in New Milford, Pennsylvania in 1874 and began studying violin at 8 years old. He received a scholarship to study violin at the National Conservatory, and led his own band in New York City at the age of 21.

In 1898 he began recording for Harms, Kaiser and Hagen, a recently formed independent record company based in New York and in September of that year won the Phonoscope gold medal for best violin record for Schumann's Traumerei. He began recording for Edison in 1899 and Zonophone and Columbia in 1900. Between 1900 and 1907 Hager served as a bandleader for Edison (Edison's Concert Band), Zonophone (Hager's Orchestra), and Columbia (Columbia Orchestra, Climax Orchestra) recording hundreds of sides and becoming the nation's leading recording orchestra.

=== Composing ===
He was composing at the same time, and beginning around 1903 published a number of successful popular songs, including Laughing Water, The Midnight Flyer, and My Ramapoo.

=== Music publishing and directing ===
He worked in music publishing between 1907 and 1910 before returning to the recording industry as a musical director (choosing artists and repertoire) for several startup companies including the Boston Talking Machine Company, Keen-O-Phone, and Rex Talking Machine. In 1918 he began as musical director for OKeh Records, one of the most successful independent labels of the time. In this role he managed the recording of Mamie Smith's historic recording of Crazy Blues that initiated the "Race Records" craze in the U.S. Hager retired from recording in 1923 to Long Island, New York and died in Dunedin, Florida in 1958.

== See also ==
- Issler's Orchestra
- Walter B. Rogers
- Charles A. Prince
