= Perry Bradford =

American composer, songwriter, and vaudeville performer (1899–1972)

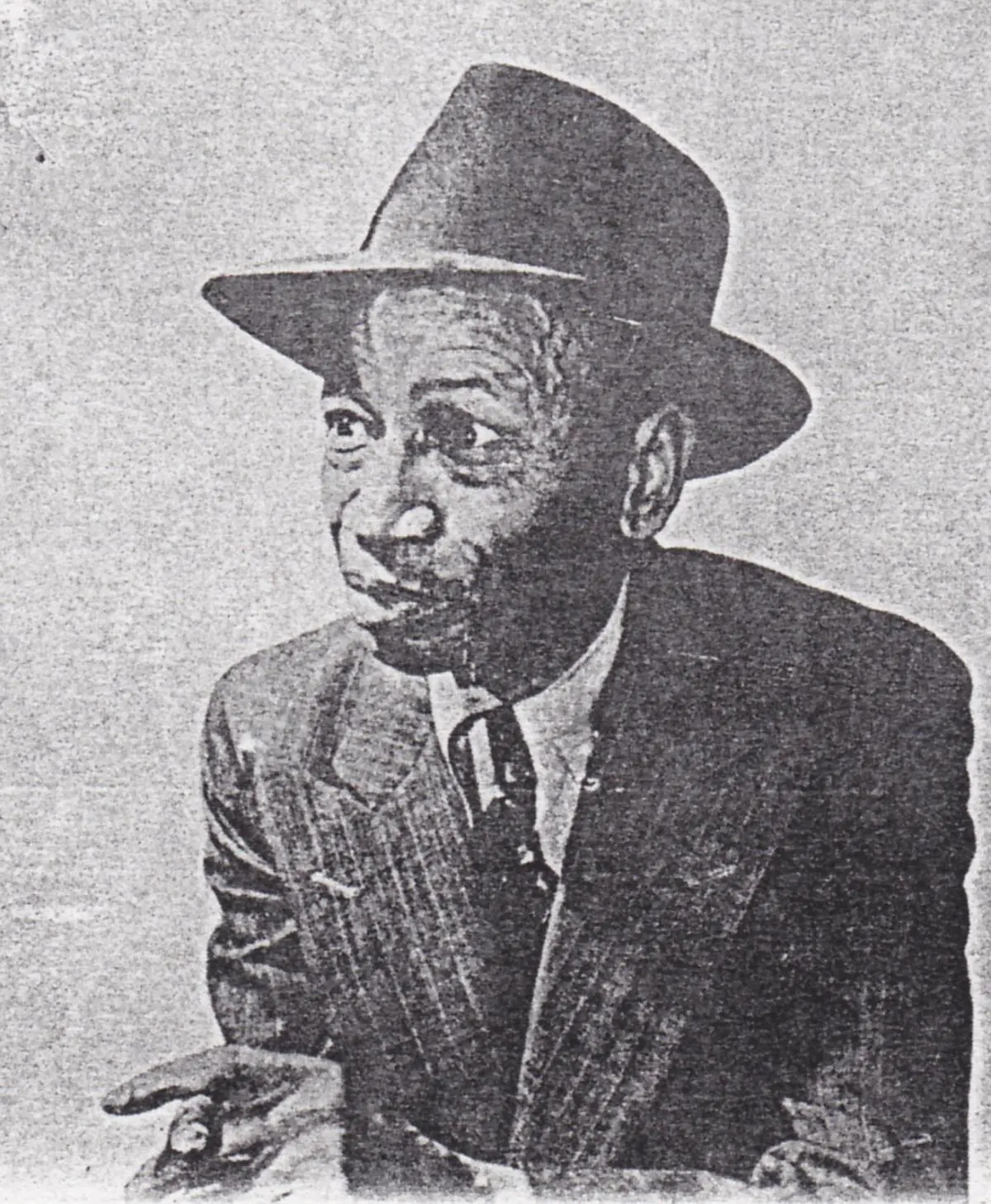

Crazy Blues
The first recording of vocal blues by an African-American singer, Mamie Smith's performance of Perry Bradford's "Crazy Blues" in 1920.

Perry Bradford (February 14, 1893, Montgomery, Alabama – April 20, 1970, New York City) was a composer, songwriter, and vaudeville performer. His most well known songs include "Crazy Blues", "That Thing Called Love," and "You Can't Keep A Good Man Down". He was nicknamed "Mule" because of his stubbornness, and he is credited with finally persuading Okeh Records to work with Mamie Smith leading to her historic blues recording in 1920.

== Early life ==
Bradford grew up in Atlanta, where his family moved when he was six.

== Career ==
In 1906 he started working in minstrel shows. He played in Chicago as a solo pianist as early as 1909 and visited New York City the following year.

Through extensive experience with traveling minstrel shows and theatre companies, Bradford obtained exposure to African-American folksongs. Bradford broke down walls of racial prejudice that had kept African-American singers from recording. Prior to Bradford's influence, African-American artists recorded in a style that was closely similar to those of white dance orchestras. There was little to no trace of African-American musical characteristics present in their recordings. Bradford persevered in getting the recording industry to value recordings of African-American artists recording in the style of their own subculture.

As a pianist, singer, dancer and composer, Bradford worked in theatre circuits throughout the South and into the North for the next decade (1908–1919) in a song and dance act billed as "Bradford and Jeanette". While in New York City, Bradford convinced Frederick W. Hager, of Okeh Records, to record Mamie Smith and became her musical director. Smith starred in Bradford's show Made in Harlem (1918). Bradford was also responsible for Smith being the first African-American blues singer to appear on record (singing his "Crazy Blues") in 1920.

Bradford claimed that his revue, Made in Harlem, was the first stage production that offered blues matter to the large, northern audience in Harlem. Bradford was able to organize the first recording session, "That Thing Called Love," that highlighted an African-American artist, accompanied by a white studio band, performing material specific to the African-American culture.

He had offices in the Gaiety Theatre office building in Times Square, New York City. The office building included offices rented out to prominent black people in the music business, such as Bill Robinson, Eubie Blake, Shelton Brooks, and W.C. Handy; the building was nicknamed "Uncle Tom's Cabin" by George M. Cohan.

Bradford toured and recorded with Smith, worked with Alberta Hunter and also headed seven recording sessions of his own during 1923–1927. Among Bradford's sidemen were Johnny Dunn, Bubber Miley, Garvin Bushell, Louis Armstrong (on two numbers in 1925), Buster Bailey, and James P. Johnson. Armstrong's session with Bradford was his last session in New York City before his return to Chicago.

Bradford continued to promote blues and jazz recordings by publishing and managing. Bradford's influence in the recording industry was negatively affected by the crash of the stock market in 1929, as well as by changes in the character of jazz and African-American songs. He was an irregular participant after the 1940s.

With the rise of the Great Depression, Bradford slipped away into obscurity. In later years, he appeared to exaggerate his role in early blues, possibly a reaction to his being nearly forgotten. In 1957, Little Richard had a hit with Bradford's "Keep A-Knockin'".

In 1965, Bradford's autobiography Born With the Blues was published (New York: Oak Publications) with a foreword by Noble Sissle.
