= Mamie Smith =

American vaudeville singer (1891–1946)

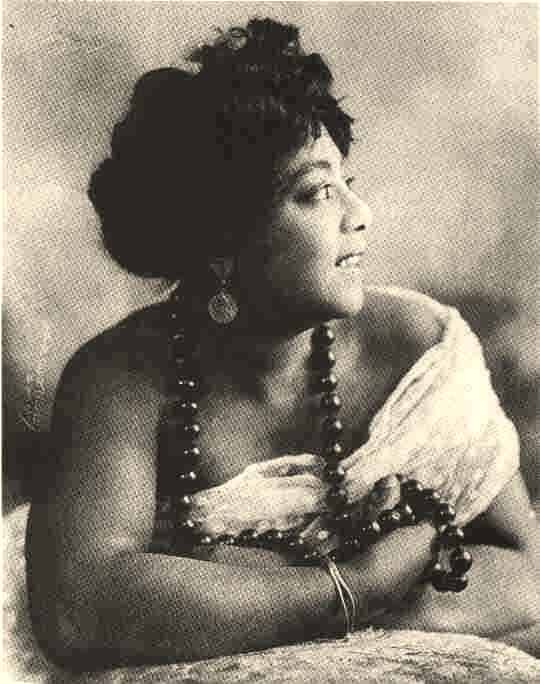

Background information
- Born: Mamie Robinson; May 26, 1891; Cincinnati, Ohio, U.S.
- Died: October 23, 1946 (aged 55) New York City, U.S.
- Genres: Blues, vaudeville
- Occupation: Singer
- Spouse(s): William "Smitty" Smith (m. 1913); Ocey "Ossey" Wilson (m. 1921); Jack Goldberg (m. 1929)

Mamie Smith (née Robinson; May 26, 1891 – October 23, 1946) was an American singer. As a vaudeville singer, she performed in multiple styles, including jazz and blues. In 1920, she entered blues history as the first African-American artist to make vocal blues recordings. Willie "The Lion" Smith (no relation) described the background of these recordings in his autobiography Music on My Mind (1964).

== Early life ==
Robinson was born in Cincinnati, Ohio in 1891. The year of her birth has been given as 1883, but in 2018, researcher John Jeremiah Sullivan discovered her birth certificate stating she was born in Cincinnati in 1891.

When she was around age 10, she found work touring with the Four Dancing Mitchells, a white act. As a teenager, she danced in Salem Tutt Whitney's Smart Set. In 1913, she left the Tutt Brothers to sing in clubs in Harlem and married William "Smitty" Smith, a singer.

== Musical career ==
On February 14, 1920, Smith recorded "That Thing Called Love" and "You Can't Keep a Good Man Down" for the Okeh label in New York City, after African-American songwriter and bandleader Perry Bradford persuaded Fred Hager to break the color barrier in black music recording. Okeh Records recorded many iconic songs by black musicians. Although this was the first recording by a black blues singer, the backing musicians were all white. Hager had received threats from Northern and Southern pressure groups saying they would boycott the company if he recorded a black singer. Despite these threats, the record was a commercial success and opened the door for more black musicians to record.

Smith's biggest hits were the August 10, 1920 recordings of a set of songs written by Perry Bradford, including "Crazy Blues" and "It's Right Here for You (If You Don't Get It, 'Tain't No Fault of Mine)", again for Okeh Records, A million copies were sold in less than a year. Many were bought by African Americans, and there was a sharp rise in sales of "race records". Because of its historical significance, "Crazy Blues" was inducted into the Grammy Hall of Fame in 1994 and was selected for preservation in the National Recording Registry of the Library of Congress in 2005.

Although other African Americans had been recorded earlier, such as George W. Johnson in the 1890s, they were performing music that had a substantial following among European-American audiences. The success of Smith's record prompted record companies to seek to record other female blues singers and began the era of what is now known as classic female blues.

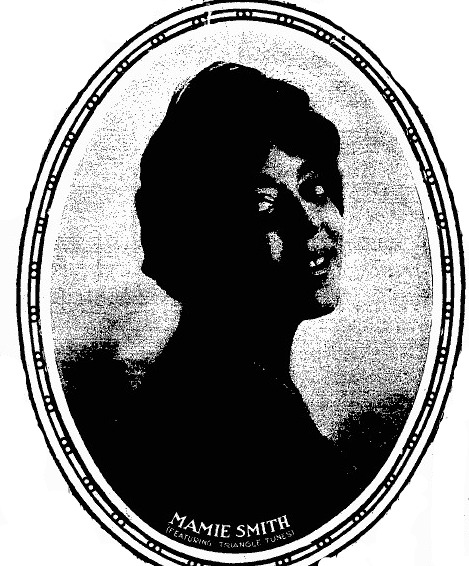
Gravure of Smith in the New York Clipper, 1921

Smith continued to make popular recordings for Okeh throughout the 1920s. In 1924, she made three releases for Ajax Records, which, while heavily promoted, did not sell well. She made some records for Victor. She toured the United States and Europe with the band Mamie Smith & Her Jazz Hounds as part of Mamie Smith's Struttin' Along Review.

She was billed as "The Queen of the Blues", a billing soon one-upped by Bessie Smith, who was called "The Empress of the Blues". Mamie found that the mass medium of radio provided a means of gaining additional fans, especially in cities with predominantly white audiences. For example, she and several members of her band performed on KGW in Portland, Oregon in early May 1923 and received positive reviews.

Recording lineups of the Jazz Hounds included (from August 1920 to October 1921) Jake Green, Curtis Moseley, Garvin Bushell, Johnny Dunn, Dope Andrews, Ernest Elliot, Porter Grainger, Leroy Parker and Bob Fuller, and (from June 1922 to January 1923) Coleman Hawkins, Everett Robbins, Johnny Dunn, Herschel Brassfield, Herb Flemming, Buster Bailey Cutie Perkins, Joe Smith, Bubber Miley, and Cecil Carpenter.

While recording with the Jazz Hounds, she recorded as Mamie Smith and Her Jazz Band, comprising George Bell, Charles Matson, Nathan Glantz, Larry Briers, Jules Levy, Jr., Joe Samuels, together with musicians from the Jazz Hounds, including Hawkins, Fuller and Carpenter.

== Film career and later years ==
Smith appeared in the early sound film Jailhouse Blues in 1929. She retired from recording and performing in 1931. She returned to performing in 1939 to appear in the movie Paradise in Harlem, produced by her husband, Jack Goldberg.

She also appeared in other films, including Mystery in Swing (1940), Sunday Sinners (1940), Stolen Paradise (1941), Murder on Lenox Avenue (1941), and Because I Love You (1943).

== Death and memorial ==
Smith died in 1946 in Manhattan, New York City, reportedly penniless. She was interred at Frederick Douglass Memorial Park on Staten Island, on ground which remained unmarked until 2013 when a monument was finally erected.

Initially, according to the Jas Obrecht Music Archive website, Smith was buried in an unmarked grave until 1963 when musicians from Iserlohn, West Germany used the money from a Hot Jazz benefit to buy a headstone that read "Mamie Smith (1883–1946): First Lady of the Blues". With the help of fellow blues singer Victoria Spivey and Record Research Magazine publisher Len Kunstadt, Smith was re-interred at Frederick Douglass Memorial Park in Richmond, New York. Smith's re-interment was celebrated with a gala honoring the late singer on January 27, 1964. However, according to the 2012 campaign website, Mamie Smith still was buried without a headstone 67 years after her death in 1946.

A successful campaign to finally acquire and erect a headstone for Smith was begun in 2012 by Michael and Anne Fanciullo Cala. The couple, respectively a blues journalist and editor, developed a months-long crowdfunding campaign on the Indiegogo website to purchase a headstone for Smith. The philanthropy Music Cares also supported the effort. The campaign raised over $8,000 that funded the creation of a four-foot-high etched granite headstone featuring an image of the late blues singer.

The monument was erected with great fanfare at Frederick Douglass Cemetery in Staten Island, New York on September 20, 2013. Excess funds from the campaign were donated to the cemetery for grounds care.

== Discography ==
Originally released in 1989 in five LP with different titles than reissued in 4 CD

- 1920-21 - Complete Recorded Works in Chronological Order Vol. 1 (Document Recs, 1995)
- 1921-22 - Complete Recorded Works in Chronological Order Vol. 2 (Document Recs, 1995)
- 1922-23 - Complete Recorded Works in Chronological Order Vol. 3 (Document Recs, 1995)
- 1923-42 - Complete Recorded Works in Chronological Order Vol. 4 (Document Recs, 1995)

== Hit records ==
Crazy Blues
Mamie Smith's performance of Perry Bradford's "Crazy Blues" in 1920.

Year	Single	US Chart
1920	"Crazy Blues"	3
1921	"Fare Thee Honey Blues"	9
1921	"Royal Garden Blues"	13
1921	"You Can't Keep a Good Man Down"	4
1921	"Dangerous Blues"	6
1922	"Lonesome Mama Blues"	6
1923	"You Can Have Him, I Don't Want Him Blues"	13
1923	"You've Got to See Mama Ev'ry Night (or You Can't See Mama at All)"	13
