= Trav'lin' Light (song) =

Single by Billie Holiday, Paul Whiteman
- Released: 1942
- Recorded: 1942
- Genre: Jazz
- Label: Capitol Records
- Songwriters: Johnny Mercer; Trummy Young; Jimmy Mundy

Billie Holiday, Paul Whiteman singles chronology
"God Bless the Child" (1941)	"Trav'lin' Light" (1942)	"Lover Man (Oh, Where Can You Be?)" (1945)

"Trav'lin' Light" is a 1942 song composed by Trummy Young and Jimmy Mundy with lyrics by Johnny Mercer.

== Background ==
When Whiteman and his band arrived at Capitol Records' studio for a recording session, Trummy Young brought along his girlfriend, Billie Holiday. Songwriter Johnny Mercer, one of the co-founders of the new label, discovered that Young had a newly written tune with him. Mercer quickly wrote lyrics for it and gave it a title so Holiday could record it with the band. The record label identified the singer as 'Lady Day,' Holiday's nickname, because she was under contract with another label.

== Chart performance ==
In 1942, with vocals by Billie Holiday, Paul Whiteman hit number one on the Harlem Hit Parade charts for three non consecutive weeks. The song also hit the pop charts at number 23 for one week. The Paul Whiteman release lists Billie Holiday as "Lady Day". The trombone is played by Skip Layton. The recording was also re-released as a V-Disc in October, 1944 by the U.S. War Department for shipment overseas for military personnel as 286A under the "Blues" category.

== Personnel ==
The song was recorded in Los Angeles on June 12, 1942 by Paul Whiteman and His Orchestra. The personnel on the recording were: Monty Kelly, Larry Neill, Don Waddilove (tp), Skip Layton, Murray McEachern, Trummy Young (tb), Alvy West, Dan D’Andrea, Lennie Hartman, Lester Young (Reeds) Buddy Weed (p), Mike Pingitore (g), Artie Shapiro (b), Willie Rodriguez (d), Unknown string section, Billie Holiday (v), Jimmy Mundy (arr), and Paul Whiteman (conductor).
