= Okeh Records =

American record label

OKeh Records
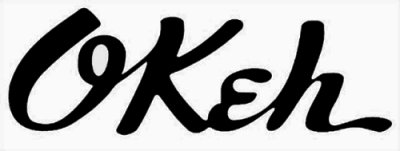
- Parent company: Sony Music Entertainment
- Founded: 1918; 108 years ago
- Founder: Otto Heinemann
- Distributors: Sony Masterworks; Legacy Recordings (reissues)
- Genre: Various (1916–1953); Rhythm & blues (1953–1970); Blues (1994–2000); Jazz (2013–present)
- Country of origin: U.S.
- Location: New York City
- Official website: okeh-records.com

OKeh Records (/ˌoʊˈkeɪ/) is an American record label founded by the Otto Heinemann Phonograph Corporation, a phonograph supplier established in 1916, which branched out into phonograph records in 1918. The name originally was spelled "OkeH" from the initials of Otto K. E. Heinemann but was changed to "OKeh". In 1965, OKeh became a subsidiary of Epic Records, and later a subsidiary of Sony Music. OKeh has since become a jazz imprint, distributed by Sony Masterworks.

== Early history ==
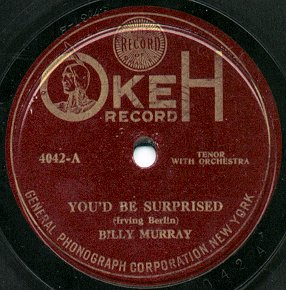
A lateral-cut recording by Billy Murray from 1919

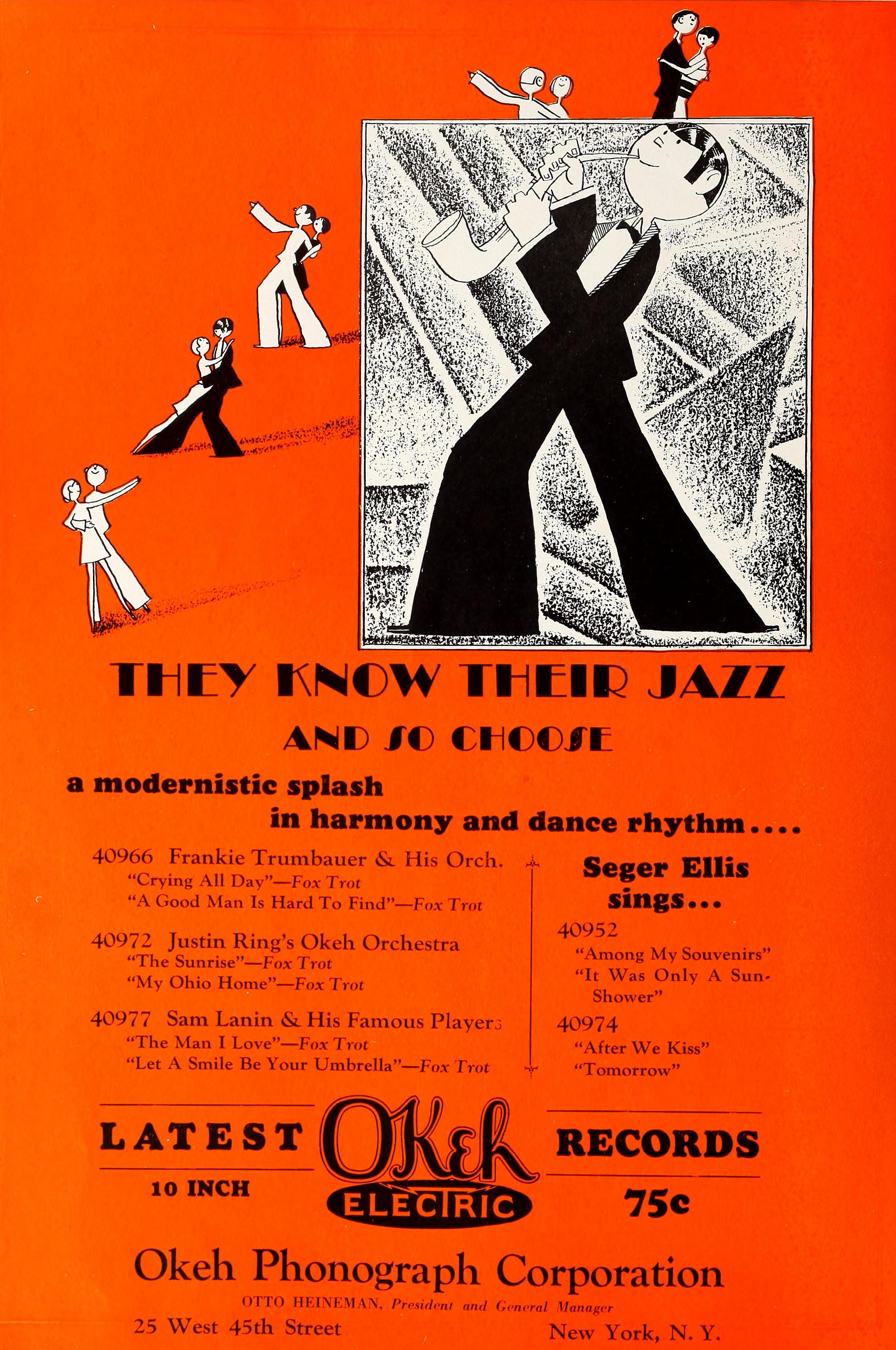
1928 advertisement

OKeh was founded by Otto (Jehuda) Karl Erich Heinemann (Lüneburg, Germany, 20 December 1876 – New York, USA, 13 September 1965) a German-American manager for the U.S. branch of Odeon Records, which was owned by Carl Lindstrom. In 1916, Heinemann incorporated the Otto Heinemann Phonograph Corporation, set up a recording studio and pressing plant in New York City, and started the label in 1918.

The first discs were vertical cut, but later the more common lateral-cut method was used. The label's parent company was renamed the General Phonograph Corporation, and the name on its record labels was changed to OKeh. The common 10-inch discs retailed for 75 cents each, the 12-inch discs for $1.25. The company's musical director was Frederick W. Hager, who was also credited under the pseudonym Milo Rega.

OKeh issued popular songs, dance numbers, and vaudeville skits similar to other labels, but Heinemann also wanted to provide music for audiences neglected by the larger record companies. OKeh produced lines of recordings in German, Czech, Polish, Swedish, and Yiddish for immigrant communities in the United States. Some were pressed from masters leased from European labels, while others were recorded by OKeh in New York.

OKeh's early releases included music by the New Orleans Jazz Band. In 1920, Perry Bradford encouraged Fred Hager, the director of artists and repertoire (A&R), to record blues singer Mamie Smith. The records were popular, and the label issued a series of race records directed by Clarence Williams in New York City and Richard M. Jones in Chicago. From 1921 to 1932, this series included music by Williams, Lonnie Johnson, King Oliver, and Louis Armstrong. Also recording for the label were Bix Beiderbecke, Lillie Delk Christian, Bennie Moten, Frankie Trumbauer, and Eddie Lang. One of the more popular series was Louis Armstrong's Hot Five and Hot Seven, who recorded about 3 sessions per year between 1925 and 1928, which included popular hits such as "Heebie Jeebies", "Cornet Chop Suey", and "West End Blues". After the success of these records, Armstrong's records were transferred to the popular series as well, which was marketed towards a white audience in 1928. As part of the Carl Lindström Company, OKeh's recordings were distributed by other labels owned by Lindstrom, including Parlophone in the UK. While musicians did not receive much payment for entering the studio, they copyrighted the songs they did record with the hopes that other bands would record the piece; in turn, they would make a steady stream from royalties

In 1926, OKeh was sold to Columbia Records. Ownership changed to the American Record Corporation (ARC) in 1934, and the race records series from the 1920s ended. CBS bought the company in 1938. OKeh was a label for rhythm and blues during the 1950s, but jazz albums continued to be released, as in the work of Wild Bill Davis and Red Saunders.

== The OKeh Laughing Record ==
The OKeh Laughing Record was recorded in Germany by Beka Records in 1920, by most accounts, and then purchased from that record label by OKeh Records in the US. It features who are likely opera singer Lucie Bernardo and Otto Rathke simply laughing for nearly three minutes while accompanied by cornetist Felix Silbers. They recorded six recordings on the same day. It became a best-seller in the US in 1922, and is estimated to have sold around a million records. OKeh Records soon followed with the "Second Laughing Record", "The OKeh Laughing Dance Record" and "The OKeh Crying Record". Other record labels also released similar records. It may have influenced studios to include live audiences and laugh tracks in their shows. It was issued in the UK as The Parlophone Laughing Record and it was featured extensively in the Walter Lantz Productions/Universal Studios 1955 cartoon short Sh-h-h-h-h-h, the last short directed by Tex Avery.

== Race records and remote recording ==
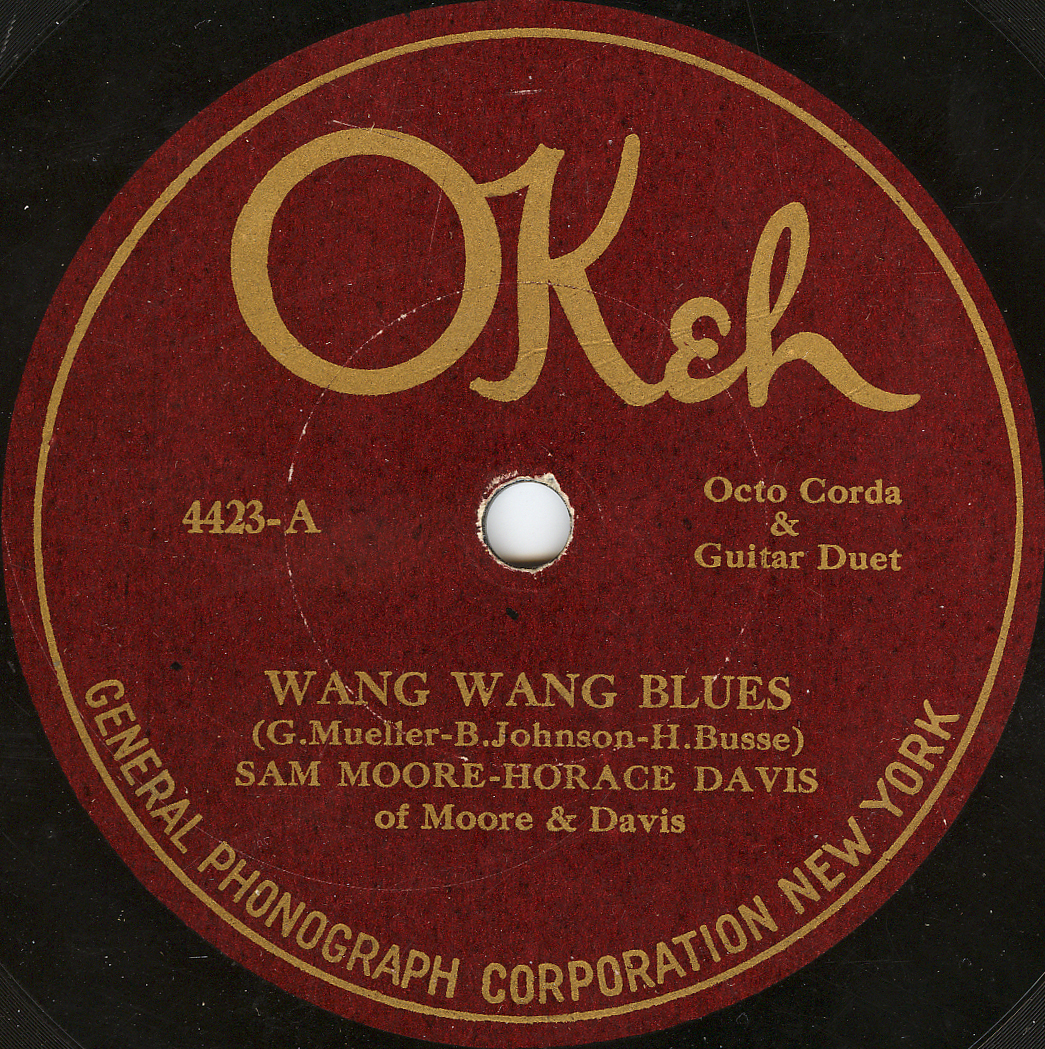
"Wang Wang Blues", 1921

General Phonograph Corporation used Mamie Smith's popular song "Crazy Blues" to cultivate a new market in 1920 and they could not keep the record on the shelves because of its popularity. Portraits of Smith and lists of her records were printed in advertisements in newspapers such as the Chicago Defender, the Atlanta Independent, New York Colored News, and others popular with African-Americans (though Smith's records were part of OKeh's regular 4000 series). OKeh had further prominence in the demographic, as African-American musicians Sara Martin, Eva Taylor, Shelton Brooks, Esther Bigeou, and Handy's Orchestra recorded for the label. OKeh issued the 8000 series for race records. The success of this series led OKeh to start recording music where it was being performed, known as remote recording or location recording. Starting in 1923, OKeh sent mobile recording equipment to tour the country and record performers not heard in New York or Chicago. Regular trips were made once or twice a year to New Orleans, Atlanta, San Antonio, St. Louis, Kansas City, and Detroit. The OKeh studio in Atlanta also catered to what was called, "Hillbilly" (now Country) stars at that time. One of the first was "Fiddlin'" John Carson, who is believed to have made the first country music recordings there in June 1923. A double sided record with "The Little Old Log Cabin in the Lane" and "The Old Hen Cackled and the Rooster's Going To Crow".

== 1940–1970 ==
OKeh releases were infrequent after 1932, although the label continued into 1935. In 1940, after Columbia lost the rights to the Vocalion name by dropping the Brunswick label, the OKeh name was revived to replace it, and the script logo was introduced on a demonstration record announcing that event. The label was again discontinued in 1946 and revived again in 1951.

In 1953, OKeh became an exclusive R&B label when its parent, Columbia, transferred OKeh's pop music artists to the newly formed Epic Records. OKeh's music publishing division was renamed April Music.

In 1963, Carl Davis became OKeh's A&R manager and improved OKeh's sales for a couple of years. Epic took over management of OKeh in 1965. Among the artists during OKeh's pop phase of the 1950s and 1960s were Johnnie Ray and Little Joe & the Thrillers.

With soul music becoming popular in the 1960s, OKeh signed Major Lance, who gave the label two big successes with "The Monkey Time" and "Um, Um, Um, Um, Um, Um". Fifties rocker Larry Williams found a musical home at OKeh for a period of time in the 1960s, recording and producing funky soul with a band that included Johnny "Guitar" Watson. He was paired with Little Richard, who had been persuaded to return to secular music. Williams produced two Little Richard albums for OKeh in 1966 and 1967, which returned Little Richard to the Billboard album chart for the first time in ten years and produced the hit single "Poor Dog". He also acted as the music director for Little Richard's live performances at the OKeh Club in Los Angeles. Bookings for Little Richard during this period skyrocketed. Williams also recorded and released material of his own and with Watson, with some moderate chart success.

Much of the success of OKeh in the 1960s was dependent on producer Carl Davis and songwriter Curtis Mayfield. After they left the label (due to disputes with Epic/OKeh head Len Levy), OKeh sales gradually slipped, and the label was quietly retired by Columbia in 1970.

== 1993–2000 ==
In 1993, Sony Music reactivated the OKeh label (under distribution by Epic Records) as a new-age blues label. OKeh's first new signings included G. Love & Special Sauce, Keb' Mo, Popa Chubby, and Little Axe. Throughout the first year, in celebration of the relaunch, singles for G. Love, Popa Chubby and Keb' Mo were released on 10-inch vinyl. By 2000, the OKeh label was again retired, and G. Love & Special Sauce was moved to Epic. It was re-launched in 2013 as a jazz line under Sony Masterworks.

== Since 2013 ==
In January 2013, Sony Music reactivated the OKeh label as Sony's primary jazz imprint under Sony Masterworks. The imprint is part of Sony Masterworks in the U.S., Sony Classical's domestic branch, focusing on both new and established artists who embody "global expressions in jazz". The new artists include David Sanborn, Bob James, Bill Frisell, Regina Carter, Somi, and Dhafer Youssef.

== Ownership ==
Sony Music Entertainment owns the global rights to the OKeh Records catalogue through Epic Records and Sony's Legacy Recordings reissue subsidiary. EMI's rights to the OKeh catalogue in the UK expired in 1968, and CBS Records took over distribution.

== See also ==
- OKeh Records artists
- List of record labels
- Ralph Peer
