= Help Me Somebody =

Single by The "5" Royales
- B-side: "Crazy, Crazy, Crazy"
- Released: April 1953
- Genre: R&B
- Length: 3:00
- Label: Apollo
- Producer(s): Lowman Pauling

The "5" Royales singles chronology
"Baby Don't Do It" (1952)	"Help Me Somebody" (1953)	"Laundromat Blues" (1953)

"Help Me Somebody" is a 1953 song by The "5" Royales. The single was the second to chart for the group and became their second and final number one on the R&B chart. The B-side, "Crazy, Crazy, Crazy", reached number five on the R&B chart.
