= Gary Stewart (music executive) =

American music executive (1957–2019)

Gary Lee Stewart (10 February 1957 – 11 April 2019) was an American music executive at Rhino Records and Apple Inc. He served as the head of Artists & Repertoire for Rhino Records in Los Angeles. After leaving Rhino Records, Stewart was hired by Apple to work on iTunes and Apple Music. At Apple, Stewart held the title of Chief Music Officer. Stewart played a part in creating many music catalogs and playlists at both companies.

Stewart was a philanthropist and organized a volunteer program at Rhino. He served on the boards of the Liberty Hill Foundation and Social Venture Network. Stewart was a donor and activist for progressive and social justice issues.

Stewart was also co-founder of the entertainment website Trunkworthy.

Stewart was culturally Jewish.
