= Crazy Blues =

1920 single by Mamie Smith and Her Jazz Hounds

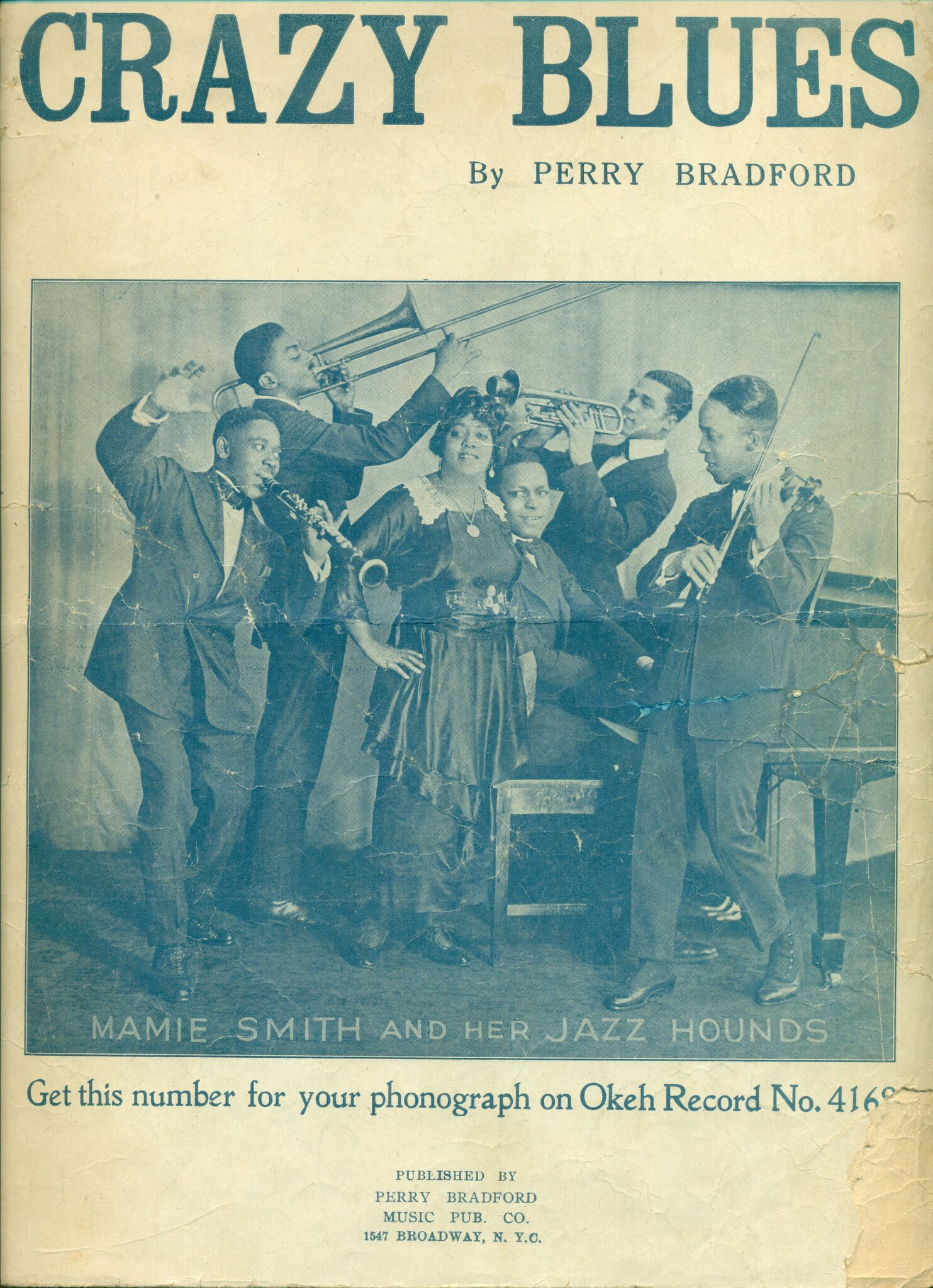
- Sheet music cover, 1920

Single by Mamie Smith and Her Jazz Hounds
- B-side: "It's Right Here For You (If You Don't Get It-'Taint No Fault O' Mine)"
- Released: 1920
- Recorded: August 10, 1920
- Genre: Blues
- Length: 3:26
- Label: Okeh
- Songwriter: Perry Bradford

"Crazy Blues" is a song written by Perry Bradford in 1918 under its original title, "Harlem Blues". Mamie Smith and Her Jazz Hounds recorded it 2 years later on August 10, 1920, and it was released later that year by Okeh Records (4169-A).

Bradford originally wrote the piece for theater, so the song includes blues choruses embedded within non blues verses rather than a straight string of twelve-bar blues.Mamie Smith learned the song directly from Bradford, and after her early successes performing it as "Harlem Blues", Bradford encouraged recording companies to record Smith's rendition of the song.

The stride pianist Willie "The Lion" Smith appeared in photographs associated with the recording session, and claims to have discovered Mamie Smith, although Bradford claims the same thing; the precise details remain uncertain. Within two months of release, it had sold 75,000 copies at one dollar a piece, an unusually big success, and a hit for the time.

== Lyrics and themes ==
The lyrics of "Crazy Blues" articulate the narrator's emotional distress after being mistreated by her partner. They detail being unable to sleep, "I can't sleep at night", or eat, "I can't eat a bite", and feeling blue due to abandonment, "he don't treat me right". As the song progresses, the narrator expresses unchanging love despite mistreatment, and the song concludes with references to death and violence, and finally with, "Now I've got the crazy blues".

The themes reflected in Crazy Blues resonated with the African American audiences who were purchasing the record, especially women, whose stories and lives were being told on a large scale to audiences for the first time. One claim being that the song spoke to the depth and intricacies of the inner lives of the consumers.

Prior to "Crazy Blues", there were not many cases of women's stories being told, and the song's success paved the way for other female African American performers to tell their stories, such as Ma Rainey.

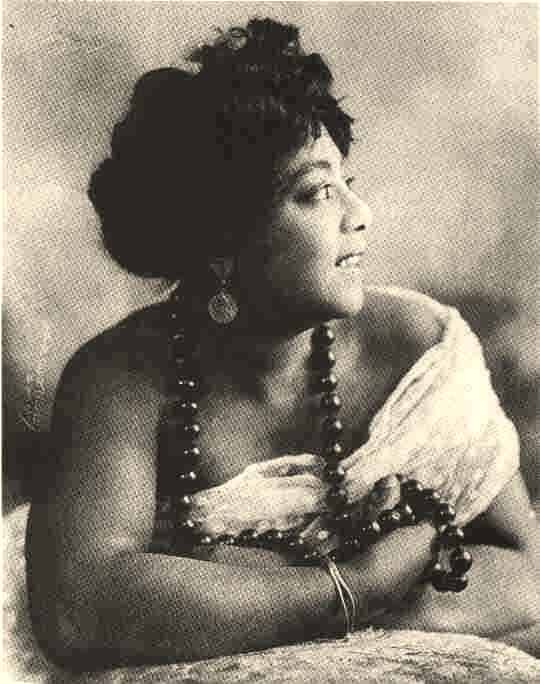
Mamie Smith

"Crazy Blues"
Full recording by Mamie Smith and Her Jazz Hounds

== Influence ==
This recording is considered a landmark as the first significant hit recording in the blues genre ever issued. Another claim is that it was the first recording with a blues title by a black artist. The record made Smith the first African American female popular singer to lead a commercial recording. The unanticipated success of "Crazy Blues" opened up a market for race records, and for the first time major record companies started producing records with an African American buyer in mind. They did their own recordings of female blues singers, hoping for the same success that "Crazy Blues" produced. The success of the record launched Mamie Smith's career, and made her a national star.

"Crazy Blues" was entered into the Grammy Hall of Fame in 1994, and later entered into the National Recording Registry of the United States Library of Congress by the National Recording Preservation Board in 2005.

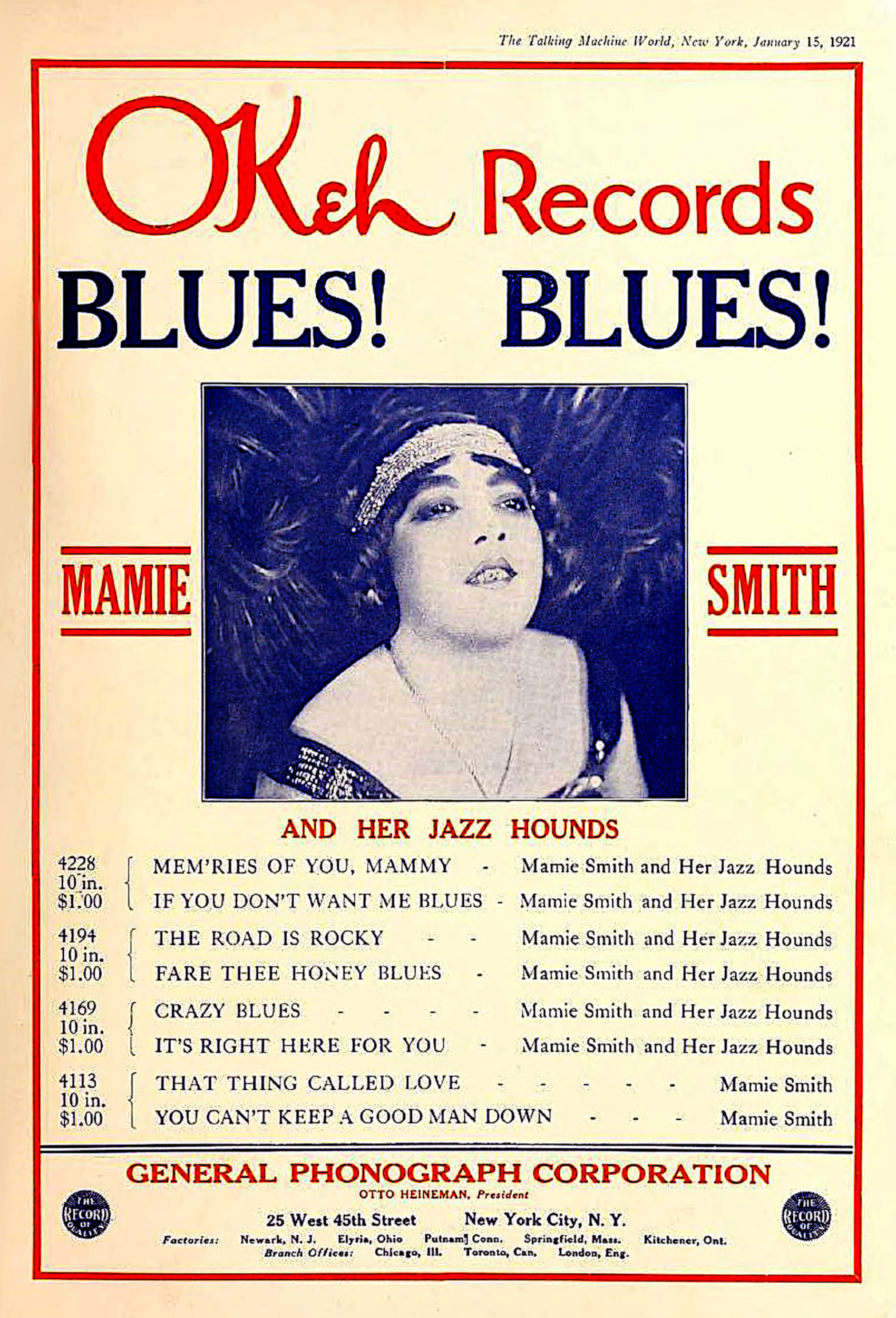
OkeH Records Advertising, Including Crazy Blues

The 1920 Mamie Smith version of the song was used in episode 10 of season 1 of Boardwalk Empire in 2010.
