= List of Harlem Hit Parade number ones of 1942 =

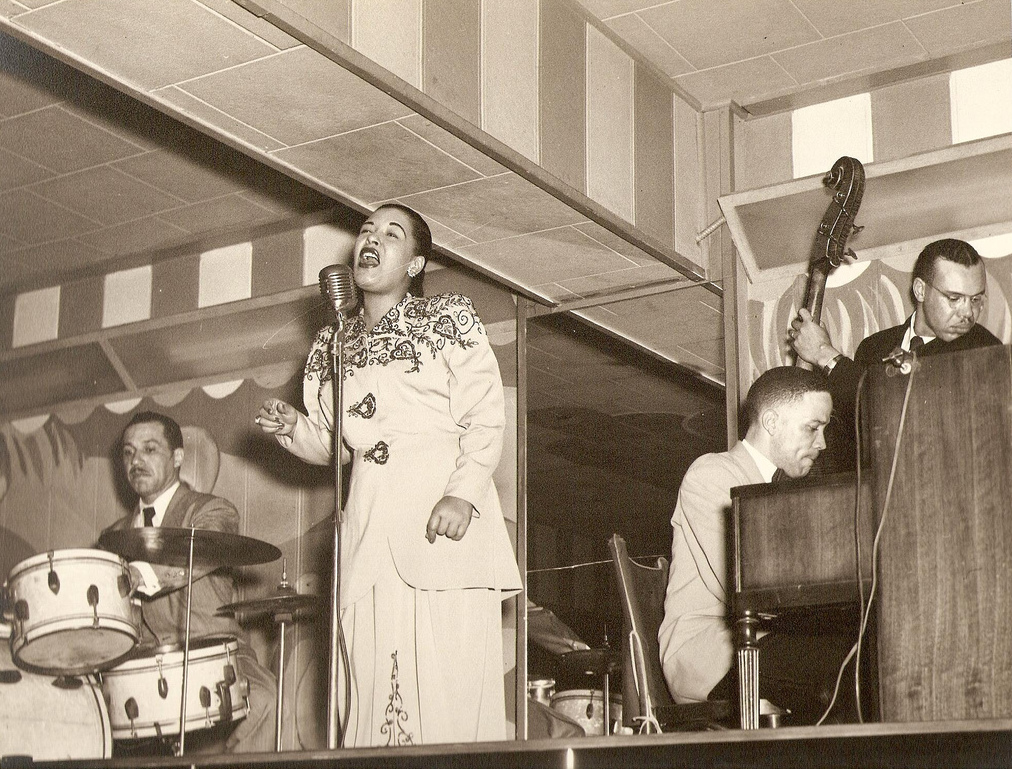
Billie Holiday was the featured vocalist on Paul Whiteman's chart-topper "Trav'lin' Light"; she was credited under the moniker "Lady Day".

In 1942, Billboard magazine launched a chart ranking the "most popular records in Harlem" titled the Harlem Hit Parade and based on a survey of record stores primarily in the Harlem district of New York City. The area has historically been noted for its African American population and has been called the "black capital of America". The chart is considered to be the start of the lineage of the magazine's R&B chart, which has undergone various name changes over the subsequent decades to reflect the evolution of African American-oriented musical genres. Since 2005 it has been published under the title Hot R&B/Hip Hop Songs. The chart was first published in the issue of Billboard dated October 24, 1942 and six songs reached number one in the remainder of the year.

Most of 1942's number ones were in the jazz and swing genres, which were among the most popular styles of music in the early 1940s. The first chart-topper was "Take It and Git" by tuba player and bandleader Andy Kirk and his band the Twelve Clouds of Joy, which occupied the top spot for a single week. It would prove to be the only chart-topper for Kirk, who remained successful until the end of the 1940s but then broke up his band and largely left the music industry.

The only song to spend multiple consecutive weeks at number one in 1942 was "White Christmas" by Bing Crosby with the Ken Darby Singers and John Scott Trotter and his orchestra, which reached the top spot in the issue of Billboard dated December 19 and remained there the following week. This was the original release of the song, written by Irving Berlin for the film Holiday Inn, which has remained a perennial favorite for more than 70 years and has been acclaimed by Guinness World Records as the world's best-selling single, with estimated sales in excess of 50 million copies worldwide. It also topped the magazine's overall National Best Selling Retail Records chart, the forerunner of the modern Hot 100. "Trav'lin' Light" by Paul Whiteman and his orchestra featuring Lady Day had the highest total number of weeks atop the chart in 1942, spending three non-consecutive weeks in the top spot. Lady Day was a pseudonym for singer Billie Holiday, one of the most influential and highly regarded jazz vocalists of all time; she was credited under her nickname because she was under contract as a soloist to a different record label.

== Chart history ==
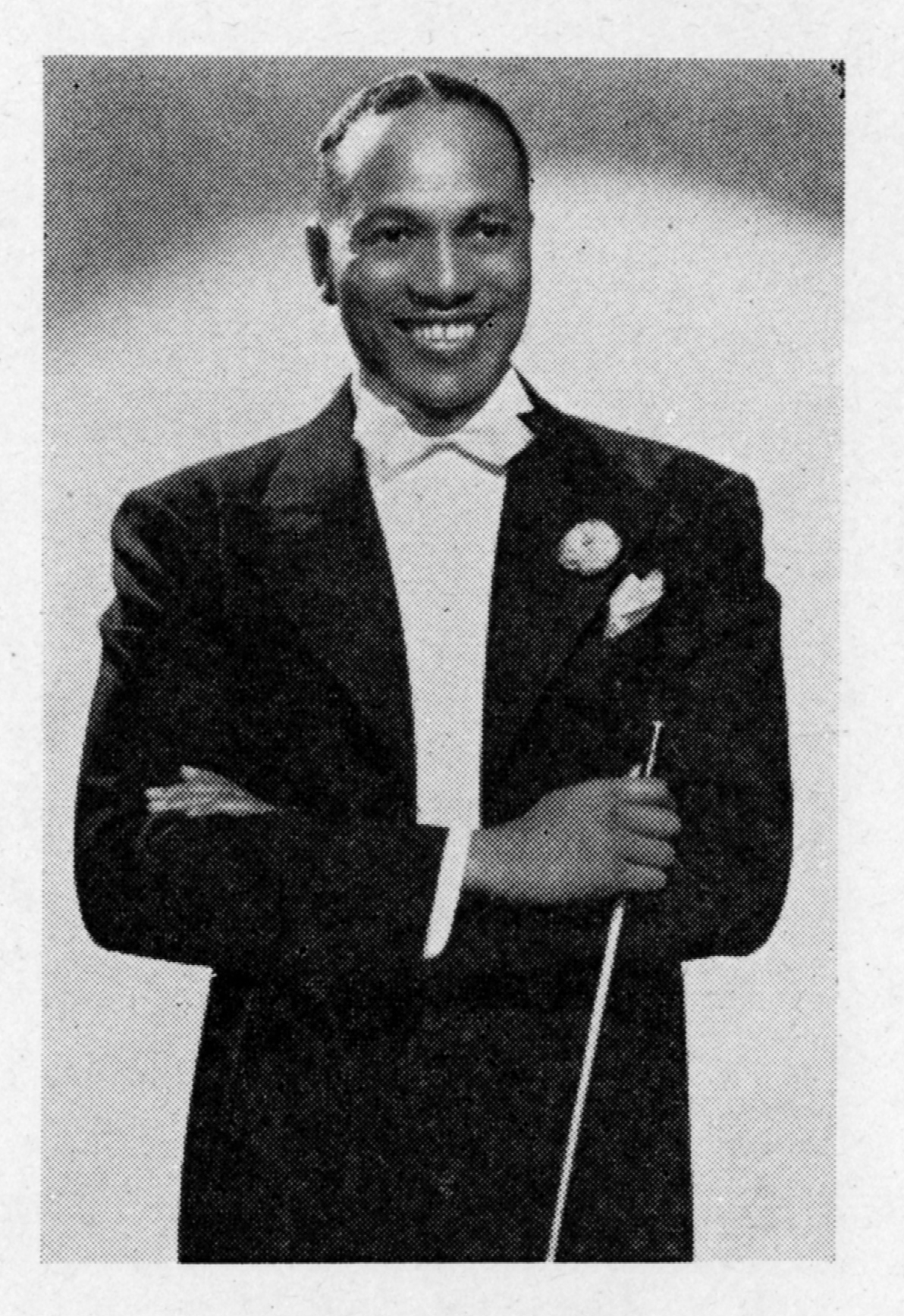
Andy Kirk and his Twelve Clouds of Joy had the first Harlem Hit Parade number one with "Take It and Git".

Chart history
Issue date	Title	Artist(s)	Ref.
October 24	"Take It and Git"	Andy Kirk and his Twelve Clouds of Joy	
October 31	"Mr. Five by Five"	Freddie Slack and his orchestra featuring Ella Mae Morse	
November 7	"Trav'lin' Light"	Paul Whiteman and his orchestra featuring Lady Day	
November 14	"Stormy Monday Blues"	Earl Hines and his orchestra featuring Billy Eckstine	
November 21	"Trav'lin' Light"	Paul Whiteman and his orchestra featuring Lady Day	
November 28	"When the Lights Go On Again"	Lucky Millinder and his orchestra	
December 5	"Trav'lin' Light"	Paul Whiteman and his orchestra featuring Lady Day	
December 12	"Mr. Five by Five"	Freddie Slack and his orchestra featuring Ella Mae Morse	
December 19	"White Christmas"	Bing Crosby with the Ken Darby Singers and John Scott Trotter and his orchestra	
December 26	"White Christmas"	Bing Crosby with the Ken Darby Singers and John Scott Trotter and his orchestra	
