= I Don't Know (Willie Mabon song) =

Single by Willie Mabon
- B-side: "Worry Blues"
- Released: November 1952
- Recorded: October 1952
- Studio: Universal Recording Corp. (Chicago)
- Genre: Rhythm and blues
- Length: 3:07
- Label: Chess; Parrot
- Songwriter: Willie Mabon

Willie Mabon singles chronology
"I Don't Know" (1952)	"I'm Mad" (1953)

"I Don't Know" is a rhythm and blues song recorded in October 1952 by Willie Mabon and His Combo. Mabon is credited as the songwriter, although blues historian Gerard Herzhaft notes that it was "inspired by Cripple Clarence Lofton".

The song was recorded at Universal Recording Corporation in Chicago. Chicago blues label Parrot Records originally issued it as a single, but Chess Records soon reissued it after purchasing Parrot. In 1952, the Chess single reached number one in the U.S. on Billboard's R&B chart in December 1952. The song is included on several compilations of Mabon's recordings as well as various artists' collections from the period. The 1959 Chess compilation album Oldies in Hi Fi includes "I Don't Know", plus the follow up hits "I'm Mad", and "Poison Ivy."

The song was covered by The Blues Brothers in 1978 for their live album Briefcase Full of Blues.
