= The Clock (song) =

Song by Johnny Ace, The Beale Streeters
- B-side: "Aces Wild"
- Released: June 1953
- Genre: Rhythm and blues
- Length: 3:01
- Label: Duke
- Songwriter(s): David James Mattis

Johnny Ace, The Beale Streeters singles chronology
"Cross My Heart" (1953)	"The Clock (song)" (1953)	"Saving My Love for You" (1954)

"The Clock" is a 1953 song by Johnny Ace with the Beale Streeters. It describes a man feeling lonely while he watches the clock. "The Clock" was Johnny Ace's third release to reach the U.S. R&B chart and second number one.

Aretha Franklin released a version of the song in 1969 as the B-side to her single, "Share Your Love with Me".
