= Baby Don't Do It =

Single by The "5" Royales
- B-side: "Take All of Me"
- Released: December 1952
- Genre: R&B
- Length: 2:40
- Label: Apollo
- Songwriter(s): Lowman Pauling

The "5" Royales singles chronology
"You Know I Know" (1952)	"Baby Don't Do It" (1952)	"Help Me Somebody" (1953)

"Baby Don't Do It" is the debut, 1953 single by The "5" Royales. The single made it to number one for three weeks on the R&B National Best Sellers chart, and was their first of two number one singles for the group. The popularity of "Baby Don't Do It" gave origin to several answer records.
