= The "5" Royales =

American R&B vocal group

- Origin: Winston-Salem, North Carolina, U.S.
- Genres: R&B
- Years active: 1951–1965
- Labels: Apollo, King, Vee-Jay, ABC-Paramount, Smash, Todd, Home Of The Blues
- Past members: Lowman "Pete" Pauling; Clarence Pauling; Jimmy Moore; Obadiah Carter; Otto Jeffries; Johnny Tanner; Gene Tanner

The "5" Royales was an American rhythm and blues (R&B) vocal group from Winston-Salem, North Carolina that combined gospel, jump blues and doo-wop, marking an early and influential step in the evolution of rock and roll. Most of their big R&B hits were recorded in 1952 and 1953 and written by the guitarist Lowman "Pete" Pauling.

Cover versions of the band's songs hit the Top 40, including "Dedicated to the One I Love" (the Shirelles and the Mamas & the Papas), "Tell the Truth" (Ray Charles and Ike & Tina Turner), and "Think" (James Brown & The Famous Flames). Brown modeled his first vocal group after the "5" Royales, and both Eric Clapton and Stax guitarist Steve Cropper cited Pauling as a key influence. The Rolling Stones singer Mick Jagger covered "Think" on his 1993 solo album Wandering Spirit.

The "5" Royales were inducted into the Rock and Roll Hall of Fame in 2015.

== History ==
Originally the Royal Sons Quintet, the group began recording for Apollo Records in the early 1950s, changing its name to the Royals after abandoning gospel for secular music. The group initially included Lowman Pauling and his brother Clarence, as founding members. Clarence Pauling later shortened his name to "Clarence Paul". He left the group to become involved with Motown as a producer. Other members included the vocalists Jimmy Moore, Obadiah Carter, and Otto Jeffries, with Johnny Tanner singing lead. Tanner's younger brother, Eugene, later replaced Jeffries. The robust Johnny Tanner sang lead on most of the group's hits, including "Think," but the sweeter-voiced Eugene Tanner stepped to the microphone for the group's best-known song, "Dedicated to the One I Love." "Baby Don't Do It" and "Help Me Somebody" became hits in 1953, and the group soon signed with King Records. In addition to heartfelt odes like "Dedicated to the One I Love," Pauling also wrote comic and risque tunes, including "Monkey Hips and Rice", later the title of a two-CD anthology of the group's music released by Rhino Records in 1994. Pauling used an extra-long strap for his guitar, sometimes playing it down around his knees for comic effect. The group shared stages with all the major R&B artists of the 1950s, including Sam Cooke and Ray Charles, once substituting for the latter's Raelettes at a show in Durham, North Carolina.

According to the Acoustic Music organization, the "first clear evidence of soul music shows up with The '5' Royales, an ex-gospel group that turned to R&B".

Confusion arose when two groups of Royals began touring, the other led by the Detroit R&B star Hank Ballard. According to members of the "5" Royales, the confusion peaked in 1953 when an unscrupulous promoter booked Ballard's group in Winston-Salem, trying to pass the Detroit band off as the hometown group with the same name, much to the chagrin of a local audience. Shortly thereafter, the air cleared when Winston-Salem's Royals became the "5" Royales and Detroit's Royals became The Midnighters. (The "5" was in scare quotes because there were actually six members at the time.) Both groups had hits at King working with Rock and Roll Hall of Fame producer Ralph Bass, becoming good friends and routinely competing in battles of the bands at clubs like the Royal Peacock, in the Sweet Auburn section of Atlanta.

With King, "Think" and "Tears of Joy" became hits for the "5" Royales in 1957. Some of their lesser-known tracks from this period are now critically acclaimed as innovative. Rock critic Dave Marsh chose the 1958 "5" Royales hit "The Slummer the Slum" as one of the top 1001 singles of all time in his book The Heart of Rock and Soul, crediting Pauling with capturing the first intentional use of guitar feedback on record, years before better-known squawks from The Beatles, The Yardbirds, and The Velvet Underground. In the 1960s, R&B gradually gave way to more polished soul music and the Royales' career waned rapidly. The band still recorded, including for Memphis label Home Of The Blues - which results were later compiled on the posthumous Catch That Teardrop album - as well as Vee-Jay, ABC-Paramount, Smash Records and the Todd label.

The "5" Royales broke up in 1965, though various combinations of musicians toured under the group's name into the 1970s. For a time Pauling continued recording with the pianist and frequent Royales collaborator Royal Abbitt as El Pauling and the Royalton. Pauling's brother, Clarence Paul, a former member of the Royal Sons Quintet, found success as a producer and songwriter at Motown Records in the 1960s.

== Post-group ==
After years of struggle with alcohol dependency, Lowman Pauling (né Lowman Pete Pauling, Jr.; 1927–1973) ended up working as a night watchman at a Manhattan church and died of an apparent seizure on December 26, 1973. He was buried in Evergreen Cemetery in Winston-Salem, as were his brother Clarence, who lies next to him, and his bandmates Otto Jeffries (1912–1975), who died on August 8, 1975, and Obadiah Carter (né Obadiah Hawthorne Carter; 1925–1994). Health problems forced Eugene Tanner (né Eugene Elijah Tanner; 1936–1994) to take disability benefits in the years before his death on December 29, 1994. His brother Johnny Tanner (né John Louis Tanner; 1924–2005) died of cancer on November 8, 2005. Jimmy Moore (aka Johnny; né James Edward Moore; 1926–2008), the last surviving member of The "5" Royales, died on August 16, 2008, at the Cedar Manor Nursing Home in Ossining, New York, after a long illness.

== Legacy ==
The "5" Royales were inducted into the North Carolina Music Hall of Fame in 2009. They were nominated unsuccessfully for the Rock and Roll Hall of Fame in 2002 and 2004; they were inducted in 2015 in the category Early Influence.

The legacy and influence of the "5" Royales was profiled on National Public Radio's Weekend Edition Sunday on August 14, 2011, in an interview with the guitarist Steve Cropper. Cropper released the album Dedicated: A Salute to the 5 Royales in 2011.

In May 2015, compilation Soul & Swagger: The Complete "5" Royales 1951-1967 won a Blues Music Award in the Historical category. Other posthumous compilations include Monkey Hips and Rice: The "5" Royales Anthology (1994), The Apollo Sessions (1995), It's Hard But It's Fair: King Hits and Rarities (2005) and The Definitive "5" Royales: Home of the Blues & Beyond (2014).

== Selected singles discography ==
Song title	Catalog ref	Date	Notes
Apollo Records
"You Know I Know"/"Courage to Love"	441	Sep 1952	No. 8 R&B
"Baby Don't Do It"/"Take All of Me"	443	Sep 1952	No. 1 R&B, 3 weeks
"Help Me Somebody"/"Crazy, Crazy, Crazy"	446	Apr 1953	No. 1 R&B, 5 weeks / No. 5
"Laundromat Blues"/"Too Much Lovin' (Much Too Much)"	448	Jul 1953	No. 4 R&B
"I Want to Thank You"/"All Righty!"	450	Oct 1953	No. 9 R&B
"I Do"/"Good Things"	452	Jan 1954	No. 6 R&B / No. 16 R&B
"Cry Some More"/"I Like It Like That"	454	Apr 1954	No. 8 R&B / No. 17 R&B
"What's That"/"Let Me Come Back Home"	458	Jul 1954	
"Six O'Clock in the Morning"/"With All Your Heart"	467	Jan 1955	
King Records
"I'm Gonna Run It Down"/"Behave Yourself"	4740	Aug. 1954	/ No. 16 R&B
"Monkey Hips and Rice"/"Devil with the Rest"	4474	Oct. 1954	
"One Mistake"/"School Girl"	4762	Dec. 1954	
"Every Dog Has His Day"/"You Didn't Learn It at Home"	4770	Jan. 1955	
"I Need Your Lovin' Baby"/"When I Get Like This"	4806	Jun 1955	
"Women About to Make Me Go Crazy"/"Do unto You"	4819	Aug. 1955	
"Someone Made You for Me"/"I Ain't Getting Caught"	4830	Oct. 1955	
"Right Around the Corner"/"When You Walked in Thru the Door"	4869	Jan 1956	
"My Wants for Love"/"I Could Love You"	4901	Feb. 1956	
"Come On and Save Me"/"Get Something Out of It"	4952	July 1956	
"Just as I Am"/"Mine Forever More"	4973	Oct. 1956	
"Thirty Second Lover"/"Tears of Joy"	5032	Mar. 1957	No. 9 R&B
"Think"/"I'd Better Make a Move"	5053	May 1957	No. 4 R&B / No. 66 Pop
"Say It"/"Messin' Up"	5082	Oct. 1957	No. 18 R&B / No. 15 R&B
"Dedicated to the One I Love"/"Don't Be Ashamed"	5098	Dec. 1957	No. 13 R&B
"Do the Cha Cha Cherry"/"The Feeling Is Real"	5131	Apr. 1958	
"Tell the Truth"/"Double or Nothing"	5141	June 1958	
"Don't Let It Be Vain"/"The Slummer the Slum"	5153	Oct. 1958	
"The Real Thing"/"Your Only Love"	5162	Nov 1958	
"Miracle of Love"/"I Know It's Hard But It's Fair"	5191	Mar. 1959	/ No. 18 R&B, No. 103 Pop
"Tell Me You Care"/"Wonder Where Your Love Has Gone"	5237	July 1959	
"It Hurts Inside"/"My Sugar Sugar"	5266	Oct. 1959	
"I'm with You"/"Don't Give Me No More Than You Can Take"	5329	Mar. 1960	No. 107 Pop
"I Got to Know"/"Please, Please, Please"	Home of the Blues 112	Mar. 1960	/ No. 114 Pop
"Why"/"(Something Moves Me) Within My Heart"	5327	Jun 1960	
"Dedicated to the One I Love"/"The Miracle of Love"		Jan. 1961	Re-release, No. 81 Pop
