= Willie Mabon =

American R&B singer, songwriter and pianist (1925–1985)

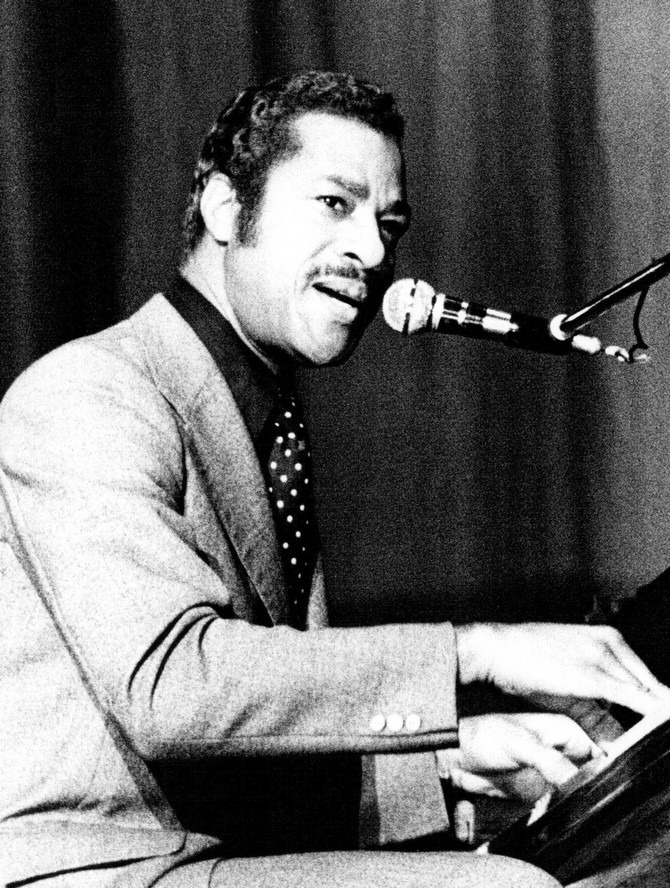
- Mabon in 1976

Background information
- Born: Willie James Mabon; October 24, 1925; Hollywood, Tennessee, U.S.
- Died: April 19, 1985 (aged 59) Paris, France
- Genres: R&B
- Occupations: Singer; songwriter
- Instruments: Vocals; piano; harmonica
- Years active: 1949–1984
- Labels: Apollo; Aristocrat; Parrot; Chess; Big Bear; Ornament

Willie James Mabon (October 24, 1925 – April 19, 1985) was an American R&B singer, songwriter, pianist, and harmonica player. He had two number one hits on the Billboard R&B chart, "I Don't Know" in 1952 and "I'm Mad" in 1953.

== Career ==
Mabon was born and brought up in the Hollywood district of Memphis, Tennessee. He moved to Chicago in 1942, by which time he had become known as a singer and pianist. He formed a group, the Blues Rockers, and in 1949 began recording for Aristocrat Records and then Chess Records.

His biggest success came in 1952 when his debut solo release, "I Don't Know", written by Cripple Clarence Lofton (who received no royalties), topped the Billboard R&B chart for eight weeks. It was one of the most popular releases of its era and was Chess's biggest hit before the successes of Chuck Berry and Bo Diddley. It was also one of the first R&B hit records to be covered by a leading white artist, Tennessee Ernie Ford. Mabon's original was played on Alan Freed's early radio shows and also sold well to white audiences, crossing over markets at the start of the rock-and-roll era.

Mabon returned to the top R&B slot in 1953 with "I'm Mad" and had another hit in 1954 with the Mel London song "Poison Ivy". He also was the first artist to record Willie Dixon's "The Seventh Son". However, his career failed to maintain its momentum, and record releases in the late 1950s on various labels were largely unsuccessful. Releases in the 1960s included "Got to Have Some", "Just Got Some", and "I'm the Fixer".

He moved to Paris in 1972 and toured and recorded in Europe as part of the promoter Jim Simpson's "American Blues Legends" tour, recording The Comeback for Simpson's Big Bear Records and an album for Ornament Records in 1977. He also performed at the Montreux Jazz Festival. He died in April 1985, after a long illness, in Paris.

== Discography ==
- I'm a Heart Regulator (Chess, 1981)
- I'm the Fixer (Original USA Recordings 1963–1964) (Flyright, 1981)
- Chess Masters (Chess, 1985)
- The Seventh Son (Charly R&B, 1993)
- The Chronological Willie Mabon 1949–1954 (Classics 'Blues & Rhythm' series, 2005)
- I'm the Fixer (The Best of the USA Records Sessions) (Fuel 2000, 2013)
- Willie's Blues: The Greatest Hits (1952–1957) (Jasmine, 2013)
- Wow! I Feel So Good (The Complete 1952–1963 Chess, Formal & USA Sides) (Soul Jam, 2021)

== See also ==
- List of Chicago blues musicians
- List of artists who reached number one on the Billboard R&B chart
