= I'm Mad (song) =

Single by Willie Mabon and his Combo
- B-side: "Night Latch"
- Released: April 11, 1953
- Recorded: February 1953
- Studio: Universal Recording, Chicago
- Genre: Rhythm and blues
- Length: 2:38
- Label: Chess
- Songwriter: Willie Mabon

Willie Mabon and his Combo singles chronology
"I Don't Know" (1952)	"I'm Mad" (1953)	"You're a Fool" (1953)

"I'm Mad" is a song written by Willie Mabon. Mabon recorded the song on February 5, 1953, at the Universal Recording studio in Chicago, along with his combo of Fred Clark on tenor saxophone, Joseph "Cool Breeze" Bell on bass guitar, and Steve Boswell on drums.

The song was Mabon's second single to top the U.S. R&B chart, spending fourteen weeks on the chart.

The success of "I'm Mad" spawned an answer song by singer, Mitzi Mars with Sax Mallard and Orchestra entitled, "I'm Glad", which peaked at number nine on the R&B chart.

It was also the basis for an animated short film by Marv Newland of the Vancouver-based studio International Rocketship Limited in 1980.
