= Billboard Top R&B Records of 1949 =

Billboard Top R&B Records of 1949 is made up of two year-end charts compiled by Billboard magazine ranking the year's top rhythm and blues records based on record sales and juke box plays.

Retail year-end	Juke box year-end	Title	Artist(s)	Label
1	1	"The Hucklebuck"	Paul Williams	Savoy
2	2	"Trouble Blues"	Charles Brown	Aladdin
3	3	"Saturday Night Fish Fry"	Louis Jordan	Decca
4	5	"Ain't Nobody's Business"	Jimmy Witherspoon	Supreme
5	6	"Little Girl, Don't Cry"	Bull Moose Jackson	King
6	7	"Tell Me So"	The Orioles	Jubilee
7	4	"Drinkin' Wine Spo-Dee-O-Dee"	Stick McGhee & Buddies	Atlantic
8	13	"Hold Me, Baby"	Amos Milburn	Aladdin
9	7	"Chicken Shack Boogie"	Amos Milburn	Aladdin
10	11	"Boogie Chillen'"	John Lee Hooker	Modern
11	16	"Baby Get Lost"	Dinah Washington	Mercury
12	12	"Rockin' at Midnight"	Roy Brown	DeLuxe
13	15	"Wrapped Up in a Dream"	Do Ray & Me	Commodore
14	14	"Bewildered"	Amos Milburn	Aladdin
15	10	"All She Wants to Do Is Rock"	Wynonie Harris	King
16	9	"Bewildered"	Red Miller Trio	Bullet
17	19	"Close Your Eyes"	Herb Lance	Sittin' In
18	NR	"Drinkin' Wine, Spo-Dee-O-Dee"	Wynonie Harris	King
19	NR	"The Hucklebuck"	Roy Milton	Specialty
20	20	"Confession Blues"	Maxin Trio (Ray Charles)	Downbeat
21	18	"Broken Hearted"	Eddie Williams	Supreme
22	21	"The Deacon's Hop"	Big Jay McNeely	Savoy
23	NR	"In the Middle of the Night"	Amos Milburn	Aladdin
24	23	"Blue and Lonesome"	Memphis Slim	Miracle
25	24	"D'Natural Blues"	Lucky Millinder	RCA Victor
26	25	"Roomin' House Boogie"	Amos Milburn	Aladdin
27	17	"Pot Likker"	Todd Rhodes Orchestra	King
28	NR	"Sneaking Around"	Rudy Render	London
29	29	"Hobo Blues"	John Lee Hooker	Modern
30	NR	"Cole Slaw"	Louis Jordan	Decca
NR	22	"Beans and Cornbread"	Louis Jordan	Decca
NR	26	"A Little Bird Told Me"	Paula Watson	Supreme
NR	27	"It's Midnight"	Little Willie Littlefield	Modern
NR	28	"Back Street"	Eddie Chamblee	Miracle
NR	29	"Texas Hop"	Pee Wee Crayton	Modern

== See also ==
- Billboard year-end top 30 singles of 1949
- 1949 in music
