= List of Billboard number-one R&B songs of 1949 =

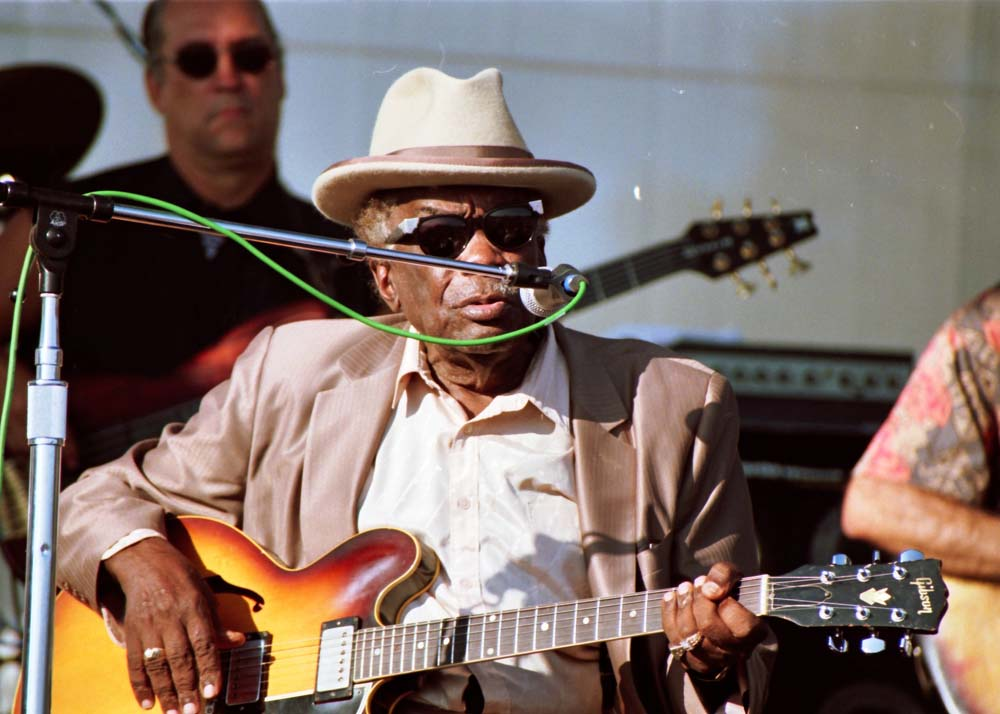
"Boogie Chillen" was a chart-topper for John Lee Hooker (pictured in 1997).

In 1949, Billboard magazine published two charts ranking the top-performing songs in the United States in African-American-oriented musical genres. The Most Played Juke Box Race Records chart had been published since 1945; placings were based on a weekly survey among jukebox operators. The Best Selling Retail Race Records listing had been launched in 1948, based on a survey of record stores nationwide in which the majority of customers purchased what were then referred to as "race records". With effect from the issue of the magazine dated June 25, the term Race Records in the titles of the charts was replaced with Rhythm & Blues. The two charts are considered to be part of the lineage of the magazine's multimetric R&B chart, which since 2005 has been published under the title Hot R&B/Hip Hop Songs.

In the issue of Billboard dated January 1, 1949, different versions of the song "Bewildered" topped the two charts: Amos Milburn's rendition was at number one on the juke box chart while the recording by the Red Miller Trio held the peak position on the best sellers listing. The following week, Milburn's version of the song took the top spot on the best seller chart, and another of his songs, "Chicken Shack Boogie", moved up to number one on the juke box listing. Despite the success of Miller's version of "Bewildered", it would prove to be the only charting song of his career. Milburn returned to number one on the juke box chart in September with "Roomin' House Boogie" and was the only artist with three R&B chart-toppers during 1949.

Three records had lengthy runs at number one in 1949, each topping both the juke box and best sellers charts for ten weeks or more. Between March and June, "The Huckle-Buck" by Paul Williams and his Hucklebuckers topped the best sellers chart for 12 non-consecutive weeks and the juke box listing for 14 non-consecutive weeks, although it would prove to be the saxophonist's only number one. The song that replaced it at number one on both charts, "Trouble Blues" by the Charles Brown Trio, topped the juke box chart for a total of 10 weeks and held the peak position on the best sellers listing for 15 consecutive weeks, the year's longest unbroken run at number one on either chart and the longest run at number one on the best sellers chart since it launched the previous year. Finally, beginning in October, Louis Jordan and his Tympany Five topped the juke box chart for 10 weeks and the best sellers listing for 11 weeks with "Saturday Night Fish Fry" (Parts I & II). The final number one of the year on both charts was "For You My Love" by Larry Darnell. The song gave Darnell, who had only been signed by a record label three months earlier, a number one with his first charting song, but his success was short-lived and his chart career lasted less than two years.

== Chart history ==
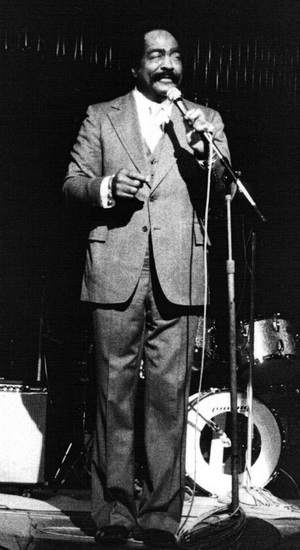
Jimmy Witherspoon reached number one with "Ain't Nobody's Business" (Parts 1 & 2)

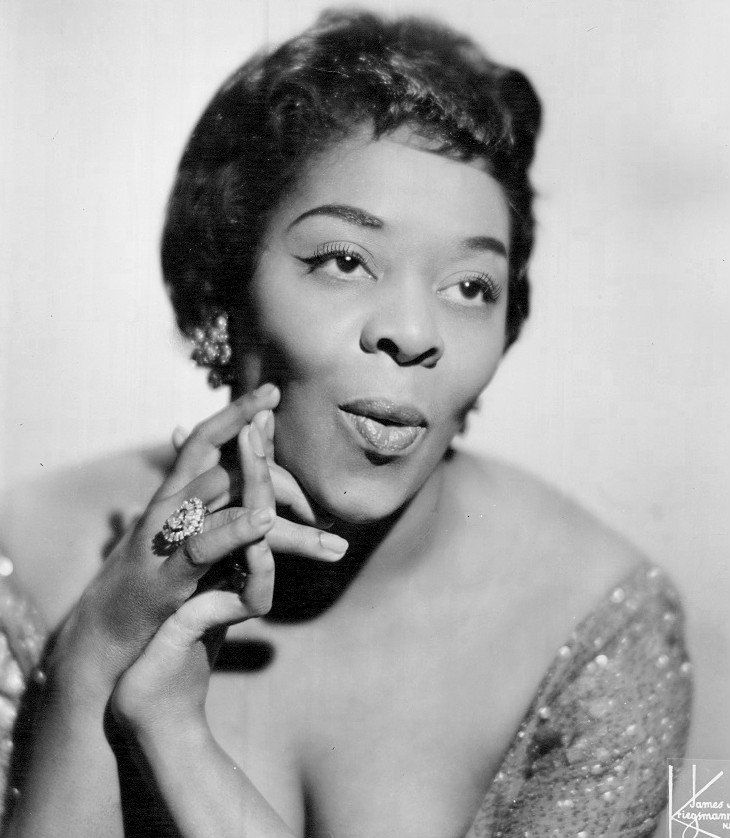
"Baby Get Lost" was a chart-topper for Dinah Washington.

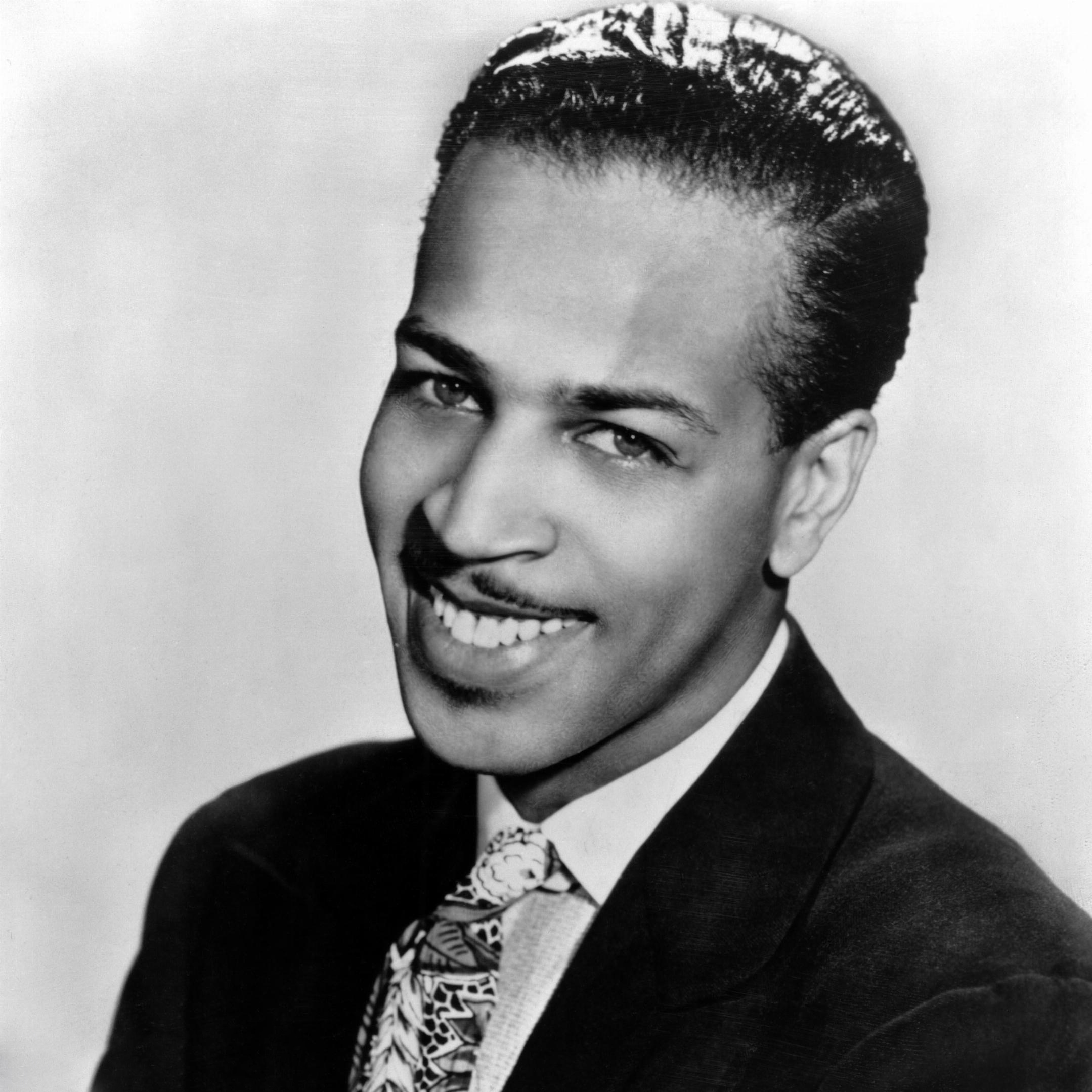
Wynonie Harris had a chart-topper with "All She Wants to Do Is Rock".

Chart history
Issue date	Juke Box		Best Sellers		Ref.
Issue date	Title	Artist(s)	Title	Artist(s)	Ref.
January 1	"Bewildered"	Amos Milburn	"Bewildered"	Red Miller Trio	
January 8	"Chicken Shack Boogie"	Amos Milburn	"Bewildered"	Amos Milburn	
January 15	"Bewildered"	Red Miller Trio	"Bewildered"	Red Miller Trio	
January 22	"Bewildered"	Red Miller Trio	"Chicken Shack Boogie"	Amos Milburn	
January 29	"Bewildered"	Red Miller Trio	"Bewildered"	Red Miller Trio	
February 5	"Chicken Shack Boogie"	Amos Milburn	"Chicken Shack Boogie"	Amos Milburn	
February 12	"Bewildered"	Red Miller Trio	"Chicken Shack Boogie"	Amos Milburn	
February 19	"Boogie Chillen"	John Lee Hooker	"The Deacon's Hop"	Big Jay McNeely's Blue Jays	
February 26	"Chicken Shack Boogie"	Amos Milburn	"Bewildered"	Amos Milburn	
March 5	"The Deacon's Hop"	Big Jay McNeely's Blue Jays	"The Huckle-Buck"	Paul Williams and his Hucklebuckers	
March 12	"The Huckle-Buck"	Paul Williams and his Hucklebuckers	"Chicken Shack Boogie"	Amos Milburn	
March 19	"Bewildered"	Amos Milburn	"The Huckle-Buck"	Paul Williams and his Hucklebuckers	
March 26	"The Huckle-Buck"	Paul Williams and his Hucklebuckers	"The Huckle-Buck"	Paul Williams and his Hucklebuckers	
April 2	"The Huckle-Buck"	Paul Williams and his Hucklebuckers	"The Huckle-Buck"	Paul Williams and his Hucklebuckers	
April 9	"The Huckle-Buck"	Paul Williams and his Hucklebuckers	"The Huckle-Buck"	Paul Williams and his Hucklebuckers	
April 16	"The Huckle-Buck"	Paul Williams and his Hucklebuckers	"The Huckle-Buck"	Paul Williams and his Hucklebuckers	
April 23	"The Huckle-Buck"	Paul Williams and his Hucklebuckers	"The Huckle-Buck"	Paul Williams and his Hucklebuckers	
April 30	"The Huckle-Buck"	Paul Williams and his Hucklebuckers	"The Huckle-Buck"	Paul Williams and his Hucklebuckers	
May 7	"The Huckle-Buck"	Paul Williams and his Hucklebuckers	"The Huckle-Buck"	Paul Williams and his Hucklebuckers	
May 14	"The Huckle-Buck"	Paul Williams and his Hucklebuckers	"The Huckle-Buck"	Paul Williams and his Hucklebuckers	
May 21	"The Huckle-Buck"	Paul Williams and his Hucklebuckers	"The Huckle-Buck"	Paul Williams and his Hucklebuckers	
May 28	"The Huckle-Buck"	Paul Williams and his Hucklebuckers	"The Huckle-Buck"	Paul Williams and his Hucklebuckers	
June 4	"The Huckle-Buck"	Paul Williams and his Hucklebuckers	"Trouble Blues"	Charles Brown Trio	
June 11	"The Huckle-Buck"	Paul Williams and his Hucklebuckers	"Trouble Blues"	Charles Brown Trio	
June 18	"Trouble Blues"	Charles Brown Trio	"Trouble Blues"	Charles Brown Trio	
June 25	"Trouble Blues"	Charles Brown Trio	"Trouble Blues"	Charles Brown Trio	
July 2	"Trouble Blues"	Charles Brown Trio	"Trouble Blues"	Charles Brown Trio	
July 9	"Trouble Blues"	Charles Brown Trio	"Trouble Blues"	Charles Brown Trio	
July 16	"The Huckle-Buck"	Paul Williams and his Hucklebuckers	"Trouble Blues"	Charles Brown Trio	
July 23	"Trouble Blues"	Charles Brown Trio	"Trouble Blues"	Charles Brown Trio	
July 30	"Trouble Blues"	Charles Brown Trio	"Trouble Blues"	Charles Brown Trio	
August 6	"Trouble Blues"	Charles Brown Trio	"Trouble Blues"	Charles Brown Trio	
August 13	"Trouble Blues"	Charles Brown Trio	"Trouble Blues"	Charles Brown Trio	
August 20	"Ain't Nobody's Business" (Parts 1 & 2)	Jimmy Witherspoon	"Trouble Blues"	Charles Brown Trio	
August 27	"Trouble Blues"	Charles Brown Trio	"Trouble Blues"	Charles Brown Trio	
September 3	"Trouble Blues"	Charles Brown Trio	"Trouble Blues"	Charles Brown Trio	
September 10	"Roomin' House Boogie"	Amos Milburn	"Trouble Blues"	Charles Brown Trio	
September 17^{[a]}	"Roomin' House Boogie"	Amos Milburn	"Tell Me So"	The Orioles	
September 17^{[a]}	"All She Wants to Do Is Rock"	Wynonie Harris	"Tell Me So"	The Orioles	
September 24	"Baby Get Lost"	Dinah Washington	"Baby Get Lost"	Dinah Washington	
October 1	"All She Wants to Do Is Rock"	Wynonie Harris	"All She Wants to Do Is Rock"	Wynonie Harris	
October 8	"Beans and Corn Bread"	Louis Jordan and his Tympany Five	"Baby Get Lost"	Dinah Washington	
October 15	"Saturday Night Fish Fry" (Parts I & II)	Louis Jordan and his Tympany Five	"Saturday Night Fish Fry" (Parts I & II)	Louis Jordan and his Tympany Five	
October 22	"Saturday Night Fish Fry" (Parts I & II)	Louis Jordan and his Tympany Five	"Saturday Night Fish Fry" (Parts I & II)	Louis Jordan and his Tympany Five	
October 29	"Saturday Night Fish Fry" (Parts I & II)	Louis Jordan and his Tympany Five	"Saturday Night Fish Fry" (Parts I & II)	Louis Jordan and his Tympany Five	
November 5	"Saturday Night Fish Fry" (Parts I & II)	Louis Jordan and his Tympany Five	"Saturday Night Fish Fry" (Parts I & II)	Louis Jordan and his Tympany Five	
November 12	"Saturday Night Fish Fry" (Parts I & II)	Louis Jordan and his Tympany Five	"Saturday Night Fish Fry" (Parts I & II)	Louis Jordan and his Tympany Five	
November 19	"Saturday Night Fish Fry" (Parts I & II)	Louis Jordan and his Tympany Five	"Saturday Night Fish Fry" (Parts I & II)	Louis Jordan and his Tympany Five	
November 26	"Saturday Night Fish Fry" (Parts I & II)	Louis Jordan and his Tympany Five	"Saturday Night Fish Fry" (Parts I & II)	Louis Jordan and his Tympany Five	
December 3	"Saturday Night Fish Fry" (Parts I & II)	Louis Jordan and his Tympany Five	"Saturday Night Fish Fry" (Parts I & II)	Louis Jordan and his Tympany Five	
December 10	"Saturday Night Fish Fry" (Parts I & II)	Louis Jordan and his Tympany Five	"Saturday Night Fish Fry" (Parts I & II)	Louis Jordan and his Tympany Five	
December 17	"Saturday Night Fish Fry" (Parts I & II)	Louis Jordan and his Tympany Five	"Saturday Night Fish Fry" (Parts I & II)	Louis Jordan and his Tympany Five	
December 24	"For You My Love"	Larry Darnell	"Saturday Night Fish Fry" (Parts I & II)	Louis Jordan and his Tympany Five	
December 31	"For You My Love"	Larry Darnell	"For You My Love"	Larry Darnell	

a. Two songs tied for number one on the Juke Box chart in this issue.
