= Route 66 Records =

Swedish record label

- Parent company: Mr R&B Record Sales
- Founded: 1977
- Founder: Jonas Bernholm
- Distributor: Swift
- Genre: Rhythm and Blues
- Country of origin: Sweden

Route 66 Records is a Swedish record production company founded by Jonas Bernholm, that reissues less well-known rhythm and blues recordings. Their motto is "The Highway To R&B". They are known to have produced the following compilation albums:

- KIX-1: Floyd Dixon: Opportunity Blues
  Texas-West Coast R&B and Blues (1948–61)
- KIX-2: Roy Brown: Laughing But Crying
  New Orleans|Texas-West Coast R&B and Blues (1947–59)
- KIX-3: Wynonie Harris: Mr. Blues Is Coming To Town
  Blues and R&B Supreme Blues shouter (1946–54)
- KIX-4: Ivory Joe Hunter: 7th Street Boogie
  West Coast Jump Blues and Boogie (1945–50)
- KIX-5: Charles Brown: Sunny Road
  Texas-West Coast Club Blues featuring Charles with Johnny Moore's Three Blazers, and New Orleans R&B (1945–60)
- KIX-6: Roy Brown: Good Rocking Tonight
  Legendary recordings, Vol.2 (1947–54)
- KIX-7: Amos Milburn: Just One More Drink (1946–54)
- KIX-8: Paul Gayten & Annie Laurie: Creole Gal (1947–57)
- KIX-9: Roy Hawkins: Why Do Everything Happen to Me? (1949–54)
- KIX-10: Little Willie Littlefield: It's Midnight (1949–57)
- KIX-11: Floyd Dixon: Houston Jump (1947–60)
- KIX-12: Jimmy McCracklin: Rockin' Man (1945–56)
- KIX-13: Billy Wright: Stacked Deck (1949–54)
- KIX-14: Bull Moose Jackson: Big Fat Mamas Are Back in Style Again (1945–56)
- KIX-15: Ivory Joe Hunter: Jumping at the Dew Drop (1947–52)
- KIX-16: Ruth Brown: Sweet Baby of Mine (1949–56)
- KIX-17: Charles Brown w/ Johnny Moore's Three Blazers: Race Track Blues (1945–56)
- KIX-18: Jimmy Liggins: I Can't Stop It (1947–52)
- KIX-19: Larry Darnell: I'll Get Along Somehow (1949–57)
- KIX-20: Wynonie Harris: Oh Babe! (1945–54)
- KIX-21: Amos Milburn: Rock, Rock, Rock (1947–57)
- KIX-22: Percy Mayfield: The Voice Within (1949–56)
- KIX-23: Peppermint Harris: I Got Loaded (1950–53)
- KIX-24: Little Caesar: Lying Woman... Goodbye Baby (1952/3)
- KIX-25: Ivory Joe Hunter: I Had a Girl (1946–52)
- KIX-26: Roy Brown: I Feel that Young Man's Rhythm (1947–54)
- KIX-27: Floyd Dixon: Empty Stocking Blues (1947–53)
- KIX-28: Amos Milburn: Let's Rock a While (1946–54)
- KIX-29: Jimmy McCracklin: I'm Gonna Have My Fun (1949–57)
- KIX-30: Wynonie Harris: Playful Baby (1945–54)
- KIX-31: Jimmy Witherspoon: Hey Mr. Landlord (1945–56)
- KIX-32: Joseph August: Rock My Soul (1949–54)
- KIX-33: Johnny Moore's Blazers: Why, Johnny, Why? (1949–56)
- KIX-34: Charles Brown: Let's Have a Ball (1945–61)
- KIX-35: Calvin Boze: Choo Choo's Bringing My Baby Home (1949–52)
- KIX-1200: Various artists: Hunter Hancock Presents Blues & Rhythm Midnight Matinee (1951)

== See also ==
- List of record labels
