= All My Life (Charles Brown album) =

Studio album by Charles Brown
- Released: 1990
- Studio: Magic Shop, New York City
- Genre: Blues
- Label: Bullseye Blues
- Producer: Ron Levy

Charles Brown chronology
One More for the Road (1986)	All My Life (1990)	Someone to Love (1992)

All My Life is an album by the American musician Charles Brown, released in 1990. It was Brown's first album for Bullseye Blues (and the first album released on the imprint), and part of a comeback effort that began with his previous release, One More for the Road. Brown supported the album with a North American tour.

The album was nominated for a Grammy Award for "Best Traditional Blues Album".

== Production ==
The album was produced by Ron Levy. Ruth Brown and Dr. John contributed to the album. Clifford Solomon played saxophone. The title track is a cover of the song made famous by Helen Ward. "Bad Bad Whiskey" was recorded in the style of Amos Milburn's version. "Joyce's Boogie" is an instrumental.

== Critical reception ==
Professional ratings
Review scores
Source	Rating
AllMusic	4.5/5 stars
Chicago Tribune	2.5/4 stars
Robert Christgau	(dud)
The Encyclopedia of Popular Music	3/5 stars
Entertainment Weekly	A−
The Penguin Guide to Blues Recordings	3/4 stars
The Rolling Stone Album Guide	4/5 stars

The Chicago Tribune wrote that "the album is done in classic Brown style and helped along by solid band support." The San Francisco Examiner determined that "Brown's piano work is loose, melodic and rhythmically irresistible." The Philadelphia Inquirer concluded that "Brown's powers of persuasion have sharpened over time." LA Weekly praised Brown's "silky baritone and impeccable phrasing." Entertainment Weekly opined that Brown's "whisper-soft baritone brings a wry elegance to stories of hard luck and bad love."

The Los Angeles Times' Mike Boehm listed the album as the 4th best of 1990. All My Life was chosen as the best blues album of 1991 by DownBeat. The Washington Post deemed the album "the finest album of his second-wind career."

== Track listing ==
No.	Title	Length
1.	"Early in the Morning"
2.	"Fool's Paradise"
3.	"Bad Bad Whiskey"
4.	"When the Sun Comes Out"
5.	"Nobody Knows the Trouble I've Seen"
6.	"That's Pretty Good Love"
7.	"A Virus Called the Blues"
8.	"Seven Long Days"
9.	"Joyce's Boogie"
10.	"Trouble Blues"
11.	"Tell Me Who"
12.	"All My Life"
13.	"Too Late"
