= Hold Me, Baby =

Single by Amos Milburn
- Released: 1949
- Length: 2:54
- Label: Aladdin
- Songwriter(s): Amos Milburn, Lola Anne Cullum

"Hold Me, Baby" is a song written by Amos Milburn and Lola Anne Cullum. Milburn performed the song (vocals and piano) on a record released on the Aladdin label (catalog no. 3023-B). The record debuted on Billboard magazine's R&B chats on April 23, 1949, peaked at No. 2 on the juke box and best seller charts, and remained on the charts for 15 weeks. It was ranked No. 8 on the magazine's year-end list of the best-selling R&B records of 1949 (No. 13 based on juke box plays).

== See also ==
- Billboard Top R&B Records of 1949
