= Trouble Blues =

Trouble Blues may refer to:

- Trouble Blues (song), a 1949 single by Charles Brown
- Trouble Blues (album), a 1981 album by Curtis Jones
