= Good Rocking Tonight (album) =

- Portrait of Roy Brown taken in 1950. Provided by Roy Brown for use as the cover.

Compilation album by Roy Brown
- Released: 1978
- Recorded: 1947–1954
- Genre: R&B, blues
- Label: Route 66 Records
- Producer: Roy Brown
- Compiler: Bengt Weine, Per Notini, and Roy Brown

Good Rocking Tonight is a compilation album by the blues musician Roy Brown.

Released by Route 66 Records in 1978 in mono as KIX-6, and is a follow-up to an earlier release titled Laughing But Crying (KIX-2). This album's subtitle is "Legendary Recordings, Vol 2 (1947–1954)". The cover features a portrait of Roy Brown, courtesy of Roy Brown, taken in 1950.

Some reviewers state that Brown's version of "Good Rocking Tonight" released in 1947, or Wynonie Harris' version from 1948, (depending on the source), is one of the contenders for the title of "first rock and roll recording". The label of the 45 RPM record by Brown included the words "Rocking blues".

The back cover includes extensive liner notes, and biographical and autobiographical information attributed to:

- John Broven: "Roy Brown", Blues Unlimited 123–124
- Jonas Bernholm: unpublished interview
- Staffan Solding: Swedish Radio Broadcast, 1978

== Track listing ==
#	Song name	Time	Location	Date
1.	"Good Rocking Tonight"	3:03	New Orleans	1947
2.	"Long About Midnight"	3:09	New Orleans	1948
3.	"Whose Hat Is That"	2:34	New Orleans	October 1947
4.	"Fore Day in the Morning"	3:00	New Orleans	October 1948
5.	"Butcher Pete, pt 2" (Brown–Bernard)	2:47	Cincinnati	November 2, 1949
6.	"Dreaming Blues"	3:11	Cincinnati	June 15, 1950
7.	"Old Age Boogie, pt 1 & 2"	4:35	New Orleans	December 19, 1952
8.	"Good Man Blues"	2:29	Cincinnati	June 15?, 1950
9.	"Miss Fanny Brown Returns"	2:39	New Orleans	1948
10.	"Brown Angel"	3:01	Cincinnati	September 27, 1951
11.	"Grandpa Stole My Baby"	2:52	Unknown	Unknown, early 1953?
12.	"Teenage Jamobree"	3:01	Cincinnati	June 22, 1950
13.	"Black Diamond"	2:31	New Orleans	September 2, 1954
14.	"This Is My last Goodbye"	2:39	Cincinnati	April 2, 1954
15.	"Mighty, Mighty Man"	2:26	Unknown	Unknown

All songs by Roy Brown except where noted.

== Personnel ==
- Placide Adams — drums [13]
- Chuck Badie — bass [10]
- Earl Barnes — tenor sax [1, 3]
- Edgar Blanchard — guitar [6, 8?, 12]
- Frank Campbell — baritone saxophone [7]
- Walter Daniels — piano [3]
- Wallace Davenport — trumpet [3]
- Salvador Doucette — piano [13]
- Jimmy Davis — guitar [7, 13, 14]
- Johnny Fontenette — tenor saxophone [5, 6, 7, 8?, 10, 12, 13]
- Percy Gabriel — bass [3]
- Albert "June" Gardner — drums [14]
- James C. Harris — piano [14]
- Wilbur Herden — trumpet [6, 8?, 12]
- Ike Isaacs — bass [6, 8?, 12]
- George Jenkins — drums [12]
- Leonard Jefferson — bass [14]
- Bill Jones — guitar [3]
- Melvin Lastie — trumpet [13]
- Ray Miller — drums [7]
- Tony Moret — trumpet [1]
- Alexander Nelson — baritone saxophone [10]
- Charlie Nelson — piano [10]
- Bob Ogden — drums [1]
- Jerome O'Neill — alto saxophone [1]
- Frank Parker — drums [5]
- Sammy Parker — tenor saxophone [7, 13, 14]
- LeRoy Rankins — baritone saxophone [5, 6, 8?, 12]
- Teddy Riley — trumpet [5, 7, 10, 14]
- Edward Santineo — piano [5, 6, 8?, 12]
- Louis Sargent — guitar [5]
- Calvin Sheilds — drums [6, 8?]
- Tommy Shelvin — bass [5, 7, 13]
- Wilbert Smith — bass [10]
- Clement Tervalon — trombone [1, 3]
- Victor Thomas — tenor saxophone [7, 14]
- Jimmy Williams — piano [7]
- Unknown — bass [1, 2, 4, 9, 11]
  — drums [2, 3, 4, 9, 11]
  — guitar [1, 11]
  — piano [1, 2, 4, 9, 11]
  — tenor saxophone [2, 4, 9, 11]
  — trombone [2, 4, 9]
  — trumpet [2, 4, 9]
