= One More for the Road (album) =

Studio album by Charles Brown
- Released: 1986
- Genre: Blues
- Label: Blue Side (1986); Alligator (1989)

Charles Brown chronology
Please Come Home for Christmas (1978)	One More for the Road (1986)	All My Life (1990)

One More for the Road is a studio album by the American blues musician Charles Brown. It was released in 1986 through Blue Side Records, and rereleased in 1989 through Alligator Records. It was regarded as a comeback album for Brown, who had been out of the spotlight for decades.

== Production ==
Nine tracks are shared between the Blue Side and Alligator releases, while two tracks are exclusive to each album. Bruce Iglauer determined the Alligator track listing.

== Critical reception ==
Professional ratings
Review scores
Source	Rating
AllMusic	3/5 stars
Chicago Tribune	4/4 stars
Robert Christgau	B+
The Encyclopedia of Popular Music	3/5 stars
The Philadelphia Inquirer	3/4 stars
The Rolling Stone Album Guide	4/5 stars

The Chicago Tribune called the album "a unique treat, a modern album with the style and patina of an earlier time," writing that "Brown`s piano is hauntingly supported by the fine back work of guitarist Billy Butler." Robert Christgau wrote that Brown's "voice slips into the lugubrious so reflexively that at times you suspect clutch problems with the master reel, and it could just be that he's best appreciated over a highball—or else, like so many chart-toppers before him, in three-minute doses." The Edmonton Journal thought that "the music takes a much more intricate exploration of melody than a straight forward blues album would." The Boston Globe said that Brown "effortlessly conjures up the right mood in his warm, husky voice and underscores it with his deft piano playing."

== Track listing (Blue Side) ==
No.	Title	Length
1.	"I Cried Last Night"	4:12
2.	"Save Your Love for Me"	4:50
3.	"Who Will the Next Fool Be"	4:06
4.	"Cottage for Sale"	4:33
5.	"Travelin' Blues"	2:46
6.	"(Get Your Kicks On) Route 66"	4:58
7.	"One for My Baby (And One More for the Road)"	5:38
8.	"My Heart Is Mended"	2:12
9.	"He's Got You"	2:45
10.	"I Miss You So"	4:05
11.	"Get Yourself Another Fool"	4:01

== Track listing (Alligator) ==
No.	Title	Length
1.	"I Cried Last Night"	4:12
2.	"Save Your Love for Me"	4:50
3.	"I Stepped into Quicksand"	2:47
4.	"One for My Baby (And One More for the Road)"	5:38
5.	"(Get Your Kicks On) Route 66"	4:58
6.	"Who Will the Next Fool Be"	4:06
7.	"You Changed My Life"	4:15
8.	"Cottage for Sale"	4:33
9.	"My Heart Is Mended"	2:12
10.	"I Miss You So"	4:05
11.	"Travelin' Blues"	2:46

== Personnel ==
- Charles Brown – piano
- Billy Butler – guitar
- Earl May – bass guitar
- Kenny Washington – drums
- Harold Ousley – tenor saxophone
