= Down the Road a Piece =

- Sheet music cover

Single by Will Bradley Trio
- B-side: "Celery Stalks at Midnight"
- Released: 1940
- Recorded: August 12, 1940
- Genre: Boogie-woogie
- Length: 3:10
- Label: Columbia
- Songwriter: Don Raye

Down the Road a Piece is a boogie-woogie song written by Don Raye. In 1940, it was recorded by the Will Bradley Trio and became a top 10 hit in the closing months of the year. Called "a neat little amalgam of bluesy rhythm and vivid, catchy lyrics", the song was subsequently recorded by a variety of jazz, blues, and rock artists.

== Recording and lyrics ==
"Down the Road a Piece" was recorded on August 12, 1940, in New York City by members of the Will Bradley–Ray McKinley Orchestra, who were credited as the "Will Bradley Trio" (a misnomer, as Will Bradley himself did not perform on the session).

The personnel consisted of pianist/songwriter Don Raye, drummer/vocalist Ray McKinley, bassist Doc Goldberg, pianist Freddie Slack, and an uncredited vibraphonist (probably Lou Shoobe or Red Ballard).

Three musicians are mentioned in the lyrics:

The drummer man's a guy they call Eight Beat Mack
And you remember Doc and ol' Beat Me Daddy Slack

"Eight Beat Mack" refers to drummer Ray McKinley, "Doc" to bassist Doc Goldberg, and "Beat Me Daddy Slack" to pianist Freddie Slack—a nod to the earlier 1940 hit "Beat Me Daddy, Eight to the Bar".

Vocals were shared by Ray McKinley and Don Raye.

== Amos Milburn's recording ==
"Down the Road Apiece"
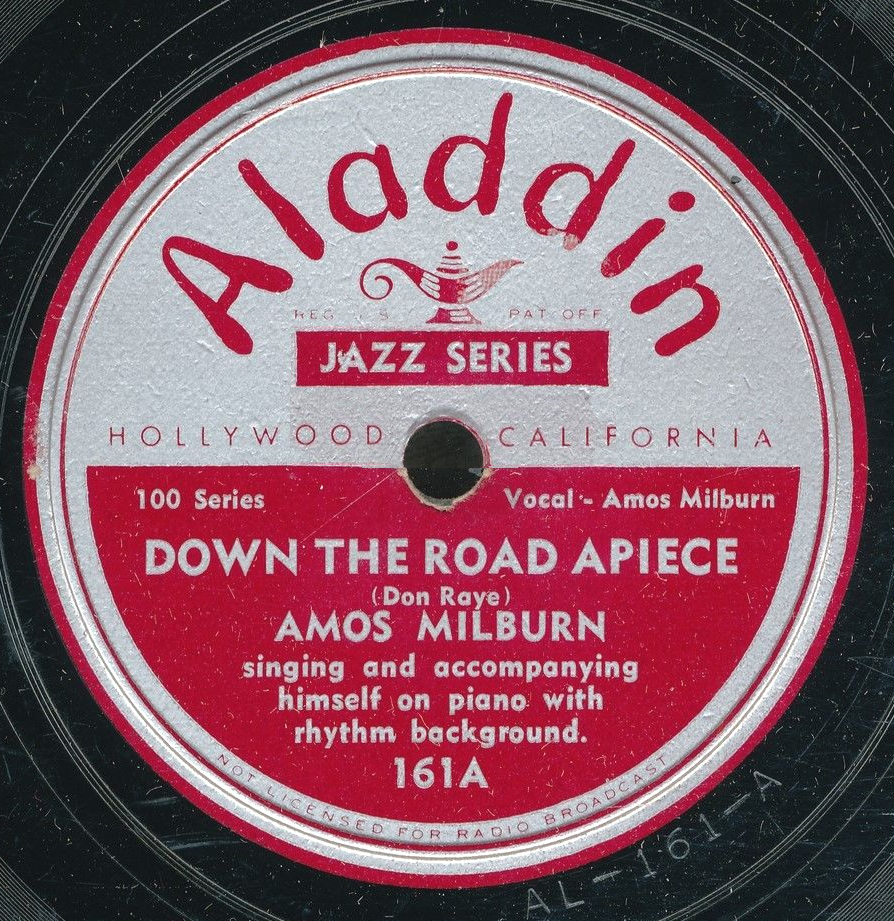
- Original 1947 Aladdin Records 78 label

Song by Amos Milburn and His Aladdin Chickenshackers
- B-side: "Don't Beg Me"
- Released: May 1947
- Recorded: December 13, 1946
- Studio: Radio Recorders, Los Angeles
- Genre: Jump blues; Boogie-woogie; Rhythm and blues
- Length: 3:01
- Label: Aladdin (cat. no. 161)
- Songwriter: Don Raye
- Producer: Eddie Mesner

Amos Milburn and His Aladdin Chickenshackers singles chronology
"Down the Road Apiece" (1947)	"Chicken Shack Boogie" (1948)

Amos Milburn and His Aladdin Chickenshackers recorded "Down the Road Apiece" on December 13, 1946, at Radio Recorders in Los Angeles. The single (Aladdin 161) was released in May 1947.

The recording is regarded as a landmark of postwar West Coast jump blues.

=== Personnel ===
- Amos Milburn – vocals, piano
- Tiny Webb – guitar
- Maxwell Davis – tenor saxophone
- Al "Cake" Wichard – drums
- Unknown – bass
- Possibly others (collectively credited as His Aladdin Chickenshackers)

== Influence ==
In his autobiography, Henry Mancini recalled that "Down the Road a Piece" inspired his 1962 composition "Baby Elephant Walk" for the film Hatari!.

The song has been recorded by numerous artists, including Chuck Berry, the Rolling Stones, and Foghat.
