= Wrapped Up in a Dream =

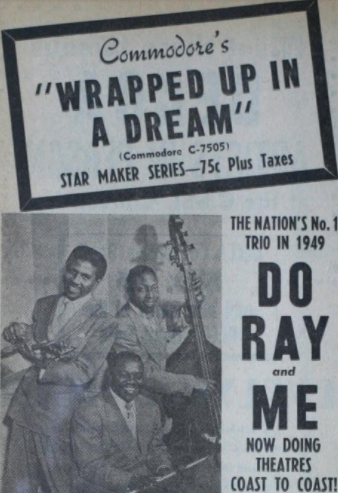

Single by Do Ray & Me
- B-side: "The Wise Old Man"
- Released: 1948
- Label: Commodore
- Songwriter(s): Pat Best, Irving Berman

"Wrapped Up in a Dream" is a song written by Pat Best and Irving Berman. It was performed by a group called Do, Ray & Me (sometimes called the Do-Ray-Me Trio). Its members were Joel Cowen (tenor, guitar), Al Russell (tenor, piano), and Curtis Wilder (tenor, bass fiddle). The record was released on the Commodore label (catalog no. C-7505-A) and peaked at No. 2 on Billboard magazine's R&B chart in March 1949. It was ranked No. 13 on Billboard's year-end list of the best-selling R&B records of 1949 (No. 15 based on juke box plays).

== See also ==
- Billboard Top R&B Records of 1949
