= Little Girl, Don't Cry =

Single by Lucky Millinder
- Released: 1949
- Label: RCA Victor
- Songwriter(s): Lucky Millinder, Doris Davis

"Little Girl, Don't Cry" is a song written by Lucky Millinder and Doris Davis.

Millinder and his orchestra recorded the song with a vocal by Big John Greer. That record was released in 1949 on the RCA Victor label (catalog no. 20-3351-B). Millinder's version of the song reached No. 15 on Billboard magazine's R&B juke box plays chart, but lasted only one week on the chart.

A cover of the song by Bull Moose Jackson and His Buffalo Bearcats was released on the King label (catalog no. 4288A). It reached No. 2 on Billboard's R&B chart and was ranked No. 5 on the magazine's year-end list of the best-selling R&B records of 1949 (No. 6 based on juke box plays).

== See also ==
- Billboard Top R&B Records of 1949
