= Wake Up and Live! =

Studio album by Floyd Dixon
- Released: 1996
- Genre: Blues, jump blues
- Label: Alligator
- Producer: Port Barlow

Floyd Dixon chronology
Marshall Texas Is My Home (1993)	Wake Up and Live! (1996)	Mr. Magnificent Hits Again (1999)

Wake Up and Live! is an album by the American musician Floyd Dixon, released in 1996. He was backed by the Full House band. Dixon supported the album with a North American tour. In recognition of Wake Up and Live!, Living Blues bestowed on Dixon its "Most Outstanding Blues Musician (Keyboards)" award. The album also won the W. C. Handy Award for "Comeback Blues Album".

== Production ==
The album was produced by Dixon's guitarist, Port Barlow, who used vintage recording equipment to achieve a 1950s sound. Dixon wrote or cowrote all of the album's songs. "Hey, Bartender" is a version of Dixon's first hit, from 1954. "My Song Is Don't Worry" is adapted from a poem Dixon used as his answering machine message. The album liner notes are by Chip Deffaa.

== Critical reception ==
Professional ratings
Review scores
Source	Rating
AllMusic	4.5/5 stars
Chicago Tribune	4/4 stars
MusicHound Blues: The Essential Album Guide	4/5 stars
The Penguin Guide to Blues Recordings	3/4 stars
Pittsburgh Post-Gazette	3.5/4 stars
The Vancouver Sun	4/5 stars

The Chicago Tribune noted that, "unlike some of the bland revivalists now exploiting [jump blues], Dixon helped to develop the idiom, and his supple piano style and infectious vocals render this set irresistible." The Vancouver Sun stated that Dixon "plays the jazz-blues of the 1950s, with his piano and vocals leading the way, acoustic bass providing the bottom and, on most tracks, a horn section kicking in for the ride." The Milwaukee Journal Sentinel listed Wake Up and Live! among the 10 best blues albums of 1996, writing that "his slow songs, such as 'My Song Is Don't Worry', have a believable desperation." The Pittsburgh Post-Gazette determined that the album "shows how alive and vital the music remains." The Ithaca Journal considered it the sixth best album of 1996.

AllMusic wrote that Dixon's "voice had not aged much, his enthusiasm is very much intact and his piano playing (whether on slow blues, medium-tempo novelties or the closing instrumental blues 'Gettin' Ready') is quite jazz-oriented."

== Track listing ==
No.	Title	Length
1.	"Hey, Bartender"
2.	"My Song Is Don't Worry"
3.	"You Know That'll Get It"
4.	"A Long Time Ago"
5.	"A Dream"
6.	"You're the Only One for Me"
7.	"450 Pound Woman"
8.	"Mean and Jealous Man"
9.	"I Wanna Rock Now"
10.	"Don't Send Me No Flowers in the Graveyard"
11.	"Wake Up and Live"
12.	"Livin' a Lie (Weak for a Woman)"
13.	"Rockin' at Home"
14.	"Got the Blues So Bad"
15.	"Skeet's California Sunshine"
16.	"Gettin' Ready"
