= Jonas Bernholm =

Swedish record producer

- Born: 26 November 1946 (age 78)
- Genres: R&B
- Occupation: Producer
- Labels: Route 66

Jonas Olof Erik Bernholm (born November 26, 1946) is a Swedish record producer. He has been active in the publishing of gramophone records and research of classical American blues, soul, gospel and rhythm & blues music. The Jonas Bernholm Rhythm & Blues Collection can be found at Smithsonian Institution.

== Career ==
During Bernholm's first trip to the United States in 1968, Bernholm came in direct contact with many artists and producers in soul, blues and rhythm & blues. He documented, interviewed, listened and was living this world of music. Back in Sweden, he created with his two friends, Bengt Weine and Per Slim Notini, a record label, Route 66 Records. The first release was Opportunity Blues (1976) by Floyd Dixon. A fierce stream of reissues of almost forgotten music begun. And all the participating artists were paid their royalties in full. "Out of the blue, just as things were really slowing down, came a lifeline from Europe" ...Ruth Brown.
Bernholm released in all 206 vinyl albums between 1976 and 2015. The labels included Route 66 Records, Mr. R & B, Stockholm, Blues Boy, Crown Prince, Saxophonograph, Jukebox Lil, "Whiskey, Women, And...", Dr. Horse, Earth Angel, and Gospel Jubilee.
Today, the Jonas Bernholm Rhythm & Blues Collection, about 25,000 copies of vinyl records, letters, clippings and photographs, can be found at the Smithsonian Institution.
The journey towards the roots of the rock - Mr. R & B saves a musical world heritage by Jan Kotschack is published on Premium Publishing 2016. Presently only available in Swedish.
