= Roomin' House Boogie =

Single by Amos Milburn
- Released: 1949
- Label: Aladdin
- Songwriter(s): Jessie M. Robinson

"Roomin' House Boogie" is a song written by Jessie M. Robinson, performed by Amos Milburn (vocal and piano), and released on the Aladdin label (catalog no. 3032A). It debuted on Billboard magazine's R&B charts on September 10, 1949, peaked at No. 1 on the juke box chart (No. 2 best seller), and remained on the charts for 11 weeks. It was ranked No. 25 on Billboard's year-end list of R&B records for 1950 based on juke box plays (No. 26 based on sales).

== See also ==
- Billboard Top R&B Records of 1950
