= Baby Get Lost =

1949 single by Dinah Washington

Song

"Baby Get Lost" is a July 1949 single by Dinah Washington (Mercury 8148). The song was written by Leonard Feather, but credited to Billy Moore, Jr. This was Dinah Washington's second number one on the R&B chart, where it stayed at the top for two weeks. The B-side, "Long John Blues", made it to number three on the R&B chart soon after.

== Other Recordings ==
- "Baby Get Lost" was also recorded by Billie Holiday, issued in September 1949 (Decca 24726) as the B-side to "Ain't Nobody's Business If I Do".
- Queen Latifah covered the song on her jazz album, The Dana Owens Album.
