= Chicken Shack Boogie =

1948 single by Amos Milburn

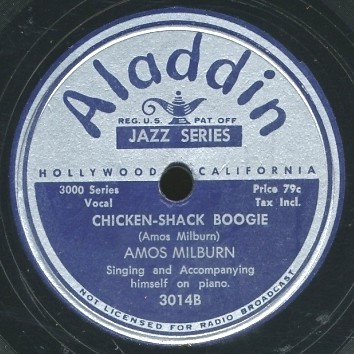
- Chicken Shack Boogie label

Single by Amos Milburn
- B-side: "It Took a Long, Long Time"
- Released: September 1948
- Recorded: November 19, 1947
- Studio: Universal, Los Angeles
- Genre: Blues, jump blues
- Length: 2:48
- Label: Aladdin
- Songwriters: Amos Milburn, Lola Cullum (Anne Cullum)

Amos Milburn singles chronology
"Down the Road a Piece" (1946)	"Chicken Shack Boogie" (1948)	"Bewildered" (1948)

"Chicken Shack Boogie" is a 1948 jump-boogie song by the West Coast blues artist Amos Milburn. It was the first of four number-one hits on the R&B chart by Milburn. It was the B-side of a 78-RPM single, the A-side of which, "It Took a Long, Long Time", reached number nine on the same chart.

In 1956, Milburn released "Chicken Shack", a faster rock-and-roll version (subsequently included on his 1957 album Let's Have a Party). This version runs about 2:30 and is sometimes titled "Chicken Shack Boogie" on later compilation albums. Earl Palmer was the drummer on this version.
