= Charles Brown (musician) =

American blues singer and pianist (1922–1999)

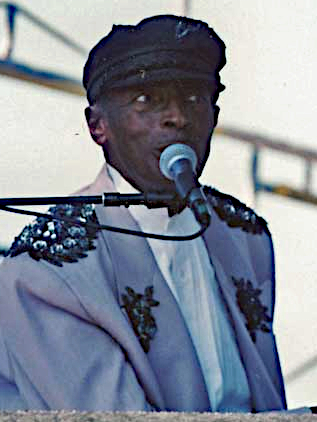
- Brown performing in 1996

Background information
- Born: Tony Russell Brown; September 13, 1922; Texas City, Texas, U.S.
- Died: January 21, 1999 (aged 76) Oakland, California, U.S.
- Genres: West Coast blues; Texas blues; soul blues; urban blues; rhythm and blues
- Occupations: Musician; songwriter
- Instruments: Piano; vocals
- Years active: 1943–1999
- Labels: Aladdin; King; Ace; Bullseye Blues; Verve; 32 Jazz
- Education: Prairie View A&M College

Tony Russell "Charles" Brown (September 13, 1922 – January 21, 1999) was an American singer and pianist whose soft-toned, slow-paced nightclub style influenced West Coast blues in the 1940s and 1950s. Between 1949 and 1952, Brown had seven Top 10 hits in the U.S. Billboard R&B chart. His best-selling recordings included "Driftin' Blues", "Merry Christmas Baby" and "Please Come Home for Christmas".

For his contribution to the blues genre, Brown was inducted into the Blues Hall of Fame (1996) and into the Rock and Roll Hall of Fame (1999). Through his career, Brown received three Grammy Award nominations for Best Traditional Blues Album for the albums All My Life (1990), Someone To Love (1992) and Charles Brown's Cool Christmas Blues (1996), and won three Blues Music Awards.

== Early life ==
Brown was born in Texas City, Texas, United States. His mother died shortly after Brown's birth and he was raised by his grandparents. As a child he loved music and received classical music training on the piano. He graduated from Central High School in Galveston, Texas, in 1939 and Prairie View A&M College in 1942 with a degree in chemistry. He then became a chemistry teacher at George Washington Carver High School in Baytown, Texas, a mustard gas worker at the Pine Bluff Arsenal at Pine Bluff, Arkansas, and an apprentice electrician at a shipyard in Richmond, California, before settling in Los Angeles in 1943.

== Career ==
=== Early success with Johnny Moore ===
In Los Angeles, an influx of African Americans from the South during World War II created an integrated nightclub scene in which black performers tended to minimize the rougher blues elements of their style. The blues-club style of a light rhythm bass and right-hand tinkling of the piano and smooth vocals became popular, epitomized by the jazz piano of Nat King Cole. When Cole left Los Angeles to perform nationally, his place was taken by Johnny Moore's Three Blazers, featuring Brown's gentle piano and vocals.

The Three Blazers signed with Exclusive Records, and their 1945 recording of "Drifting Blues", with Brown on piano and vocals, stayed on the U.S. Billboard R&B chart for six months, putting Brown at the forefront of a musical evolution that changed American musical performance. Brown led the group in a series of further hits for Aladdin over the next three years, including "New Orleans Blues" and the original version of "Merry Christmas Baby" (both in 1947) and "More Than You Know" (1948). Brown's style dominated the influential Southern California club scene on Central Avenue, in Los Angeles, during that period. He influenced such performers as Floyd Dixon, Cecil Gant, Ivory Joe Hunter, Percy Mayfield, Johnny Ace and Ray Charles.

=== Solo success ===
In the late 1940s, a rising demand for blues was driven by a growing audience among white teenagers in the South, which quickly spread north and west. Blues singers such as Louis Jordan, Wynonie Harris and Roy Brown were getting much of the attention, but what writer Charles Keil dubs "the postwar Texas clean-up movement in blues" was also beginning to have an influence, driven by blues artists such as T-Bone Walker, Amos Milburn and Brown. Their singing was lighter and more relaxed, and they worked with bands and combos that had saxophone sections and played from arrangements.

Brown left the Three Blazers in 1948 and formed his own trio with Eddie Williams (bass) and Charles Norris (guitar). He signed with Aladdin Records and had immediate success with "Get Yourself Another Fool" and then had one of his biggest hits, "Trouble Blues", in 1949, which stayed at number one on the Billboard R&B chart for 15 weeks in the summer of that year. He followed with "In the Evening When the Sun Goes Down", "Homesick Blues", and "My Baby's Gone", before having another R&B chart-topping hit with "Black Night", which stayed at number one for 14 weeks from March to June 1951.

His final hit for several years was "Hard Times" in 1951. Brown's approach was too mellow to survive the transition to the harsher rhythms of rock and roll, despite his recording in Cosimo Matassa's New Orleans studio in 1956, and he faded from national attention. Though he was unable to compete with the more aggressive sound that was increasing in popularity, he had a small, devoted audience, and his songs were covered by the likes of John Lee Hooker and Lowell Fulson.

His "Please Come Home for Christmas", a hit for King Records in 1960, remained seasonally popular. "Please Come Home for Christmas" had sold over one million copies by 1968 and was awarded a gold disc in that year.

In the 1960s Brown recorded two albums for Mainstream Records.

=== Later career ===
In the 1980s Brown made a series of appearances at the New York City nightclub Tramps. As a result of these appearances he signed a recording contract with Blue Side Records and recorded One More for the Road in three days. Blue Side Records closed soon after, but distribution of its records was picked up by Alligator Records. Soon after the success of One More for the Road, Bonnie Raitt helped usher in a comeback tour for Brown.

He began a recording and performing career again, under the musical direction of the guitarist Danny Caron, to greater success than he had achieved since the 1950s. Other members of Charles's touring ensemble included Clifford Solomon on tenor saxophone, Ruth Davies on bass and Gaylord Birch on drums. Several records received Grammy Award nominations. In the 1980s Brown toured widely as the opening act for Raitt.

=== Tributes and awards ===
Brown was inducted into the Blues Hall of Fame in 1996 and was inducted into the Rock and Roll Hall of Fame in 1999. He was a recipient of a 1997 National Heritage Fellowship awarded by the National Endowment for the Arts, which is the highest honor in the folk and traditional arts in the United States.

Brown was nominated for the Grammy Award for Best Traditional Blues Album three times: in 1991 for All My Life, 1992 for Someone To Love and 1995 for Charles Brown's Cool Christmas Blues. Between 1987 and 2005, he was nominated for seventeen Blues Music Awards (formerly known as the W. C. Handy Awards) in multiple categories, with a win in the Blues Instrumentalist: Piano/Keyboard category in 1991, and wins in the Male Blues Vocalist category in 1993 and 1995.

== Death ==
Brown died of congestive heart failure in 1999 in Oakland, California. He was interred at Inglewood Park Cemetery, in Inglewood, California.

== Discography ==
Releases by Brown with Johnny Moore's Three Blazers are located in that discography.

=== As leader ===
- Mood Music (Aladdin, 1952) [10" LP]
- Drifting Blues (Score, 1957)
- Sings Christmas Songs (King, 1961)
- The Great Charles Brown That Will Grip Your Heart (King, 1963)
- Boss of the Blues (Mainstream, 1964)
- Ballads My Way (Mainstream, 1965)
- Legend! (ABC-Bluesway, 1970)
- Blues 'n' Brown (Jewel, 1972)
- Great Rhythm & Blues Oldies, Volume 2: Charles Brown (Blues Spectrum, 1974)
- Merry Christmas Baby (Big Town, 1977)
- Music, Maestro, Please (Big Town, 1978)
- Please Come Home for Christmas (King/Starday/Gusto, 1978)
- One More for the Road (Blue Side, 1986; Alligator, 1989)
- All My Life (Bullseye Blues/Rounder, 1990)
- Someone to Love (Bullseye Blues, 1992)
- Blues and Other Love Songs (Muse, 1992; 32 Jazz, 2000)
- These Blues (Gitanes/Verve, 1994)
- Just a Lucky So and So (Bullseye Blues, 1994)
- Charles Brown's Cool Christmas Blues (Bullseye Blues, 1994)
- Live (Charly Blues Legends Live, Vol. 8) (Charly Blues, 1995)
- Marian McPartland's Piano Jazz With Guest: Charles Brown (TJA/The Jazz Alliance, 1995)
- Honey Dripper (Gitanes/Verve, 1996)
- So Goes Love (Gitanes/Verve, 1998)
- In a Grand Style (Bullseye Blues, 1999)

=== Aladdin releases ===
- 3020 "Get Yourself Another Fool" (RR609) b/w "Ooh! Ooh! Sugar" (RR608), 1948, released 1949 (Billboard R&B chart No. 4)
- 3021 "A Long Time" (RR617) (Billboard R&B chart No. 9) b/w "It's Nothing" (RR612), 1949 (Billboard R&B chart No. 13)
- 3024 "Trouble Blues" (RR613) b/w "Honey Keep Your Mind on Me" (RR600), 1949 (Billboard R&B chart No. 1, 15 weeks)
- 3030 "In the Evening When the Sun Goes Down" (RR611) b/w "Please Be Kind" (RR616), 1949 (Billboard R&B chart No. 4)
- 3039 "Homesick Blues" (RR603) b/w "Let's Have a Ball" (RR677), 1949 (billed as Charles Brown & His Smarties) (Billboard R&B chart No. 5)
- 3044 "Tormented" (RR673) b/w "Did You Ever Love a Woman" (RR679), 1949, released 1950
- 3051 "My Baby's Gone" (RR1521) b/w "I Wonder When My Baby's Coming Home" (RR604), 1950 (Billboard R&B chart No. 6)
- 3060 "Repentance Blues" (RR1522) b/w "I've Got That Old Feeling" (RR1529), 1950
- 3066 "I've Made Up My Mind" (RR1528) b/w "Again" (RR1520), 1950
- 3071 "Texas Blues" (RR1525) b/w "How High the Moon" (RR607), 1950
- 3076 "Black Night" (RR1619) b/w "Once There Lived a Fool" (RR1623), 1950, released 1951 (Billboard R&B chart No. 1, 14 weeks)
- 3091 "I'll Always Be in Love with You" (RR1621) b/w "The Message" (RR1648), 1950, released 1951 (Billboard R&B chart No. 7)
- 3092 "Seven Long Days" (RR1620) b/w "Don't Fool with My Heart" (RR1527), 1950, released 1951 (Billboard R&B chart No. 2)
- 3116 "Hard Times" (RR1752) b/w "Tender Heart" (RR1750), 1951, released 1952 (Billboard R&B chart No. 7)
- 3120 "Still Water" (RR1751) b/w "My Last Affair" (RR602), 1951, released 1952
- 3138 "Gee" (RR1523) b/w "Without Your Love (RR1531), 1950, released 1952
- 3157 "Rollin' Like a Pebble in the Sand" (RR2018) b/w "Alley Batting" (RR674), 1952
- 3163 "Evening Shadows" (RR2017) b/w "Moonrise" (RR1650), 1952
- 3176 "Rising Sun" (RR2019) b/w "Take Me" (RR676), 1952, released 1953
- 3191 "I Lost Everything" (UN2125) b/w "Lonesome Feeling" (UN2127), 1953
- 3200 "Don't Leave Poor Me" (UN2126) b/w "All My Life" (RR1649), not released
- 3209 "Cryin' and Driftin' Blues" (RR2212) b/w "P.S. I Love You" (RR2215), 1953 (billed as Charles Brown with Johnny Moore's Three Blazers)
- 3220 "Everybody's Got Troubles (RR2254) b/w "I Want to Fool Around with You" (RR2257), 1953, released 1954 (billed as Charles Brown with Johnny Moore's Three Blazers)
- 3235 "Let's Walk" (RR2253) b/w "Cryin' Mercy" (RR2214), 1953, released 1954 (billed as Charles Brown with Johnny Moore's Three Blazers)
- 3235 "Let's Walk" (RR2253) b/w "Blazer's Boogie" (111B) (re-release) 1953, released 1954 (billed as Charles Brown with Johnny Moore's Three Blazers)
- 3254 "My Silent Love (RR2255) b/w "Foolish" (RR601), 1953, released 1954 (billed as Charles Brown with Johnny Moore's Three Blazers)
- 3272 "Honey Sipper" (RR2328) b/w "By the Bend of the River" (RR2329), 1954
- 3284 "Nite After Nite" (RR2331) b/w "Walk with Me" (RR2332), 1954, released 1955
- 3290 "Fool's Paradise" (CAP2486) b/w "Hot Lips and Seven Kisses (Mambo)" (CAP2484), 1955 (billed as Charles Brown with Ernie Freeman's Combo)
- 3296 "My Heart Is Mended" (CAP2483) b/w "Trees, Trees" (CAP2487), 1955 (billed as Charles Brown with Ernie Freeman's Combo)
- 3316 "Please Don't Drive Me Away" (CAP2489) b/w "One Minute to One" (CAP2488), 1955, released 1956 (billed as Charles Brown with Ernie Freeman's Combo)
- 3339 "I'll Always Be in Love with You" (NO2725) (re-recording) b/w "Soothe Me" (NO2726), 1956
- 3342 "Confidential" (NO2754) b/w "Trouble Blues" (reissue), 1956
- 3348 "Merry Christmas Baby" (NO2730) (re-recording) b/w "Black Night" (reissue), 1956
- 3348 "Black Night" (reissue) b/w "Ooh! Ooh! Sugar" (reissue), 1957 (post-Christmas re-release)
- 3366 "It's a Sin to Tell a Lie" (NO2727) b/w "Please Believe Me" (NO2728), 1956, released 1957
- 3422 "Hard Times" (reissue) b/w "Ooh! Ooh! Sugar" (reissue), 1958

=== Imperial releases ===
- 5830 "Fool's Paradise" (reissue) b/w "Lonesome Feeling" (reissue), 1962
- 5902 "Merry Christmas Baby" (reissue) b/w "I Lost Everything" (reissue), 1962
- 5905 "Drifting Blues" (reissue) b/w "Black Night" (reissue), 1963
- 5961 "Please Don't Drive Me Away" (reissue) b/w "I'm Savin' My Love for You" (RR2330), 1963

=== East West (Atlantic subsidiary) release ===
- 106 "When Did You Leave Heaven" (EW-2753) b/w "We've Got a Lot in Common" (EW-2755), 1957, released 1958

=== Ace releases ===
- 561 "I Want to Go Home" (with Amos Milburn) (S-253) b/w "Educated Fool" (with Amos Milburn) (S-254), 1959
- 599 "Sing My Blues Tonight" (S-843) b/w "Love's Like a River" (S-844), 1960

=== Teem (Ace subsidiary) release ===
- 1008 "Merry Christmas Baby" (A-1113-63) b/w "Christmas Finds Me Oh So Sad (Please Come Home for Christmas)" (A-1114-63), 1961, released 1963

=== King releases ===
- 5405 Charles Brown, "Please Come Home for Christmas" (K4912) b/w Amos Milburn, "Christmas Comes but Once a Year" (K4913), 1960
- 5439 "Baby Oh Baby" (K4992) b/w "Angel Baby" (K4993), 1961
- 5464 "I Wanna Go Back Home" (with Amos Milburn) (K10607) b/w "My Little Baby" (with Amos Milburn) (K10608), 1961
- 5523 "This Fool Has Learned" (K10892) b/w "Butterfly" (K10893), 1961
- 5530 "It's Christmas All Year Round" (K10897) b/w "Christmas in Heaven" (K10947), 1961
- 5570 "Without a Friend" (K10983) b/w "If You Play with Cats" (K10984), 1961
- 5722 "I'm Just a Drifter" (K11405) b/w "I Don't Want Your Rambling Letters" (K11406), 1963
- 5726 "It's Christmas Time" (K10898) b/w "Christmas Finds Me Lonely Wanting You" (K10950), 1961, released 1963
- 5731 "Christmas Questions" (K10954) b/w "Wrap Yourself in a Christmas Package" (K10956), 1961, released 1963
- 5802 "If You Don't Believe I'm Crying (Take a Look at My Eyes)" (K11687) b/w "I Wanna Be Close" (K11689), 1964
- 5825 "Lucky Dreamer" (K11688) b/w "Too Fine for Crying" (K11690), 1964
- 5852 "Come Home" (K11691) b/w "Blow Out All the Candles (Happy Birthday to You)" (K11692), 1964
- 5946 "Christmas Blues" (K10948) b/w "My Most Miserable Christmas" (K10955), 1961, released 1964
- 5947 "Christmas Comes but Once a Year" (K10951) b/w "Bringing In a Brand New Year" (K10949), 1961, released 1964

=== Mainstream release ===
- 607 "Pledging My Love" (R5KM-7389) b/w "Tomorrow Night" (R5KM-7390), 1965

=== Ace release ===
- 775 "Please Come Home for Christmas" (92772-A) (reissue) b/w "Merry Christmas Baby" (92772-1B) (reissue), 1966

=== King releases ===
- 6094 "Regardless" (K12330) b/w "The Plan" (K12331), 1967
- 6192 "Hang On a Little Longer" (K12723) b/w "Black Night" (K12724) (re-recording), 1968
- 6194 "Merry Christmas Baby" (K12725) (re-recording) b/w "Let's Make Every Day a Christmas Day" (K10946), 1968
- 6420 "For the Good Times" (K14276) b/w "Lonesome and Driftin'" (K14277), 1973
