= All She Wants to Do Is Rock =

1949 single by Wynonie Harris

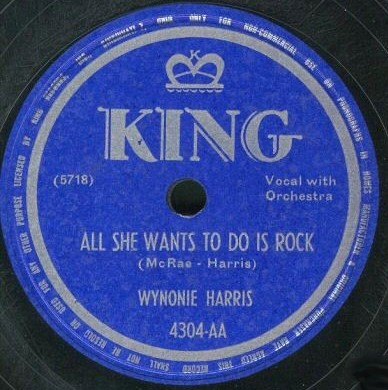
- Original King Records 78 rpm label

Single by Wynonie Harris
- B-side: "I Want My Fanny Brown"
- Released: August 1949
- Recorded: April 13, 1949
- Studio: Linden, New Jersey
- Genre: Jump blues; rhythm and blues
- Length: 2:32
- Label: King Records
- Songwriter: Wynonie Harris · Teddy McRae
- Producer: Henry Glover

Wynonie Harris singles chronology
"Drinkin' Wine Spo-Dee-O-Dee" (1949)	"All She Wants to Do Is Rock" (1949)	"Sittin' on It All the Time" (1950)

"All She Wants to Do Is Rock" is a 1949 jump blues and rhythm and blues song recorded by American singer Wynonie Harris with the Joe Morris Orchestra. Written by Harris and saxophonist Teddy McRae, it was released in August 1949 as a single by King Records (catalog number 4304). The song became the biggest hit of Harris's career, topping both of Billboard's Most-Played Juke Box Rhythm & Blues Records chart for two weeks and the Best-Selling Retail Rhythm & Blues Records chart for one week in late 1949.

== Background and recording ==
The song was cut during the final recording session of Harris's short but fruitful partnership with trumpeter Joe Morris and his orchestra. The session took place on April 13, 1949, in Linden, New Jersey, and was produced by Henry Glover.

The arrangement is built on a mid-tempo shuffle groove with riffing horns, handclaps, and a prominent honking tenor saxophone solo by the young Johnny Griffin.

=== Personnel ===
According to the original King session files and subsequent discographical research:

- Wynonie Harris – vocals
- Joe Morris – trumpet
- Matthew Gee – trombone
- Johnny Griffin – tenor saxophone
- Fred Douglas – tenor saxophone
- William McLemore – baritone saxophone
- Elmo Hope (billed as Elmo Sylvester) – piano
- Gene Ramey – bass
- Kelly Martin – drums

== Chart performance ==
"All She Wants to Do Is Rock" entered the Billboard Most-Played Juke Box Rhythm & Blues Records chart on August 27, 1949. It reached number one on September 17, holding the top spot for two weeks, and also topped the Best-Selling Retail Rhythm & Blues Records chart for the week ending October 1, 1949.

The single remained on the charts for 18 weeks, making it Harris's longest-charting hit and his second (and final) R&B number-one single, following "Good Rockin' Tonight" in 1948.

== Legacy ==
The song is regarded as one of the quintessential jump-blues recordings of the postwar era and an important precursor to rock and roll. It has been included on numerous Wynonie Harris compilations as well as influential rock-and-roll and rhythm-and-blues anthologies.
