= Floyd Dixon =

American R&B pianist and singer (1929–2006)

- Born: February 8, 1929; Marshall, Texas, United States
- Died: July 26, 2006 (aged 77) Orange County, California, United States
- Genres: Rhythm and blues, Texas blues, West Coast blues
- Occupations: Pianist, singer
- Instrument: Piano
- Years active: 1949–2006
- Label: Various

Floyd Dixon (February 8, 1929 – July 26, 2006) was an American rhythm-and-blues pianist and singer.

== Early life ==
Dixon was born in Marshall, Texas. Some sources give his birth name as Jay Riggins Jr., although Dixon himself stated that Floyd Dixon was his real name and that his parents were Velma and Ford Dixon. Growing up, he was influenced by blues, gospel, jazz and country music. His family moved to Los Angeles, California, in 1942, and Dixon met Charles Brown, who had an influence on his music.

== Career ==
Dixon played piano and was the lead vocalist with the group Eddie Williams and His Brown Buddies. Williams played bass and they recorded on the Supreme label in Los Angeles. Headshots of the band members appeared in a 1949 advertisement in Billboard.

The self-dubbed "Mr. Magnificent", Dixon signed a recording contract with Modern Records in 1949, specializing in jump blues and sexualized songs like "Red Cherries", "Wine Wine Wine", "Too Much Jelly Roll" and "Baby Let's Go Down to the Woods". Both "Dallas Blues" and "Mississippi Blues", credited to the Floyd Dixon Trio, reached the Billboard R&B chart in 1949, as did "Sad Journey Blues", issued by Peacock Records in 1950.

Dixon replaced Charles Brown on piano and vocals in the band Johnny Moore's Three Blazers in 1950, when Brown departed to start a solo career. The group recorded for Aladdin Records and reached the R&B chart with "Telephone Blues" (credited to Floyd Dixon with Johnny Moore's Three Blazers). Staying with the record label, Dixon had a small hit under his own name in 1952 with "Call Operator 210". He switched to Specialty Records in 1952 and to Cat Records, a subsidiary of Atlantic Records in 1954. "Hey Bartender" (later covered by the Blues Brothers) and "Hole in the Wall" were released during this time.

In the 1970s Dixon left the music industry for a quieter life in Texas, though he did occasional tours in the 1970s and 1980s. In 1984 he was commissioned to write "Olympic Blues" for the 1984 Summer Olympics.

In 1993, Dixon received a Pioneer Award from the Rhythm and Blues Foundation. In the mid-1990s, he secured a contract with Alligator Records, releasing the critically acclaimed album Wake Up and Live!

On June 1 and 2, 2006, Dixon hosted a concert with Pinetop Perkins and Henry Gray, celebrating the intergenerational aspect of blues piano. The band was led by Kid Ramos and included Larry Taylor and Richard "Bigfoot" Innes. Kim Wilson, Fred Kaplan (from the Hollywood Blue Flames) and Lynwood Slim also performed. This concert was recorded and released on the DVD Time Brings About a Change by HighJohn Records on March 6, 2013.

Dixon died of kidney failure in Orange County, California, in July 2006, at the age of 77, having suffered from cancer. A public memorial service was held in Grace Chapel, at the Inglewood Park Cemetery.

== Discography ==
=== Chart singles ===
| Year | Single | Chart Positions |
| Year | Single | US R&B |
|---|---|---|
| 1949 | "Dallas Blues" | 10 |
| 1949 | "Mississippi Blues" | 14 |
| 1950 | "Sad Journey Blues" | 8 |
| 1951 | "Telephone Blues" | 4 |
| 1952 | "Call Operator 210" | 4 |

=== LP releases ===
- Live in Sweden (Great Dame 001), 1975
- Opportunity Blues (Route 66 KIX-1), 1976 (compilation of recordings from 1948 to 1961)
- Rockin' This Joint Tonite: Ace Holder / Kid Thomas / Floyd Dixon Featuring Johnny Guitar Watson (JSP 1002), 1978
- Houston Jump (Route 66 KIX-11), 1979 (compilation of recordings from 1947 to 1960)
- Empty Stocking Blues (Route 66 KIX-27), 1985 (compilation of recordings from 1947 to 1953)

=== CD releases ===
- Wake Up and Live! (Alligator 4841), 1996
- Mr. Magnificent Hits Again (HMO 2450), 1999
- Fine! Fine! Thing! (Highjohn 1739), 2005
- Time Brings About a Change ... A Floyd Dixon Celebration (Highjohn 5206), 2006

=== CD compilations ===
- Marshall Texas Is My Home (Specialty 7011), 1991; also issued on Ace CHD-361, 1993
- Floyd Dixon: His Complete Aladdin Recordings, 2-CD set (Capitol-EMI 36293), 1996
- The Cocktail Combos: Nat King Cole / Charles Brown / Floyd Dixon, 3-CD set (Capitol-EMI 52042), 1997
- Cow Town Blues: The Seminal 1948–1950 Modern Recordings (Ace CHD-740), 2000
- Floyd Dixon: Hey Bartender! His Very Best 1949–1959 (Jasmine JASMCD-3065), 2016
- The Floyd Dixon Singles Collection 1949–1962, 3-CD set (Acrobat ACTRCD-9074), 2018

== See also ==
- List of blues musicians
- List of jump blues musicians
- List of people from Marshall, Texas
- List of stage names
- List of West Coast blues musicians
- West Coast blues
