= Roy Brown (blues musician) =

American blues singer (d. 1981)

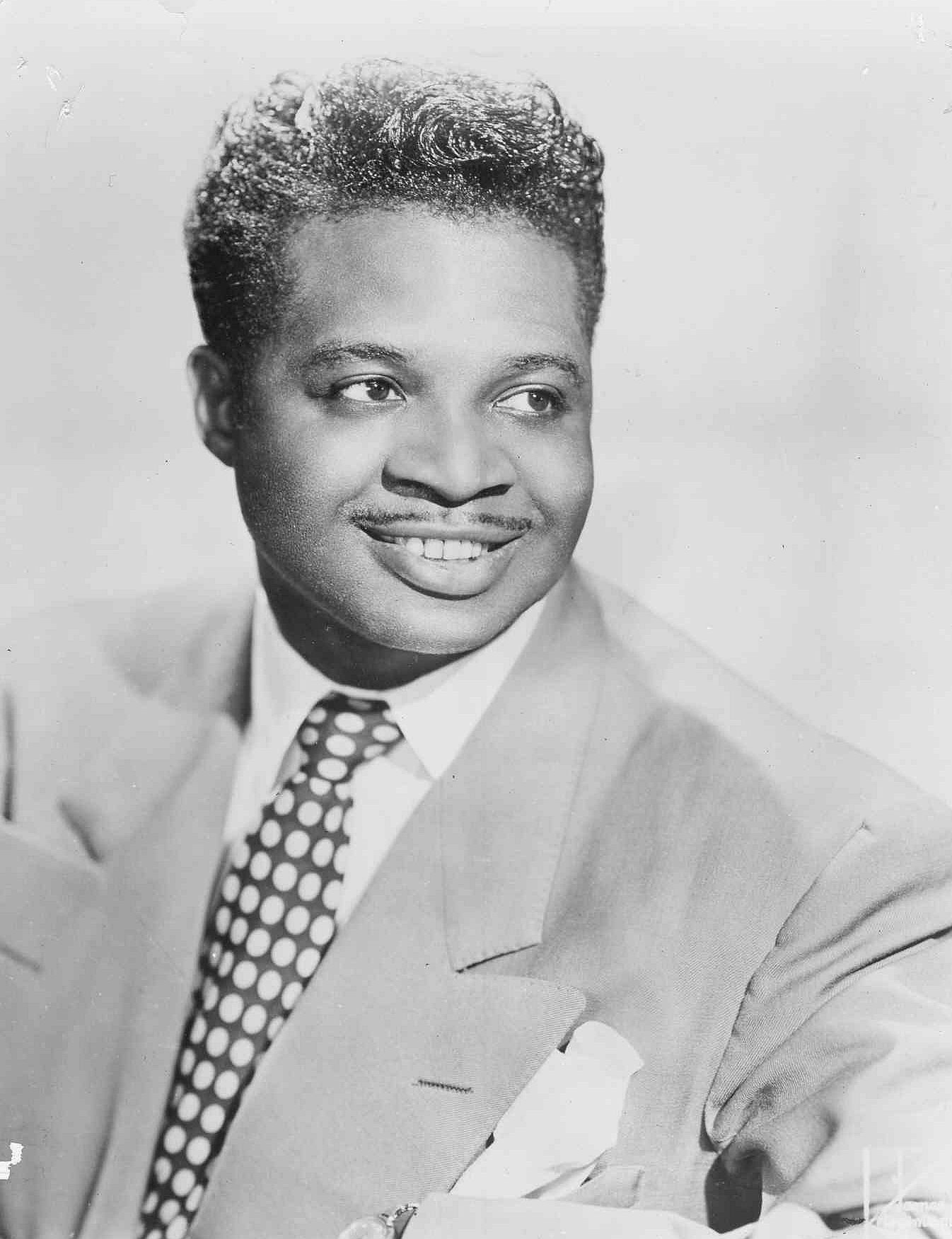

Background information
- Born: Roy James Brown; September 10, 1920 or 1925; Kinder, Louisiana, U.S.
- Died: May 25, 1981 (aged 55 or 60) San Fernando, California, U.S.
- Genres: Jump blues; R&B; rock and roll; urban blues
- Occupation: Singer
- Years active: 1945–1981

Roy James Brown (September 10, 1920 or 1925 – May 25, 1981) was an American blues singer who had a significant influence on the early development of rock and roll and the direction of R&B. His original song and hit recording "Good Rockin' Tonight" has been covered by many artists including Wynonie Harris, Elvis Presley, Bruce Springsteen, Paul McCartney, Joe Ely, Ricky Nelson, Jerry Lee Lewis, Pat Boone, James Brown, the Doors, the Treniers, and the rock group Montrose. Brown was one of the first popular R&B singers to perform songs with a gospel-steeped delivery, which was then considered taboo by many churches. In addition, his melismatic, pleading vocal style influenced notable artists such as Elvis Presley, B. B. King, Bobby Bland, Jackie Wilson, James Brown and Little Richard.

== Early life and education ==
Brown was born in Kinder, Louisiana. Some sources report his birth date as September 10, 1925, but the researchers Bob Eagle and Eric LeBlanc gave the date as September 10, 1920, on the basis of information in the 1930 census and Social Security records, and stated that 1925 is incorrect. Media reports state that he was either 55 or 56 at the time of his death.

Like many R&B singers, Brown started singing gospel music in church. His mother was an accomplished singer and church organist. He moved to Los Angeles in the 1940s and for a short time was a professional boxer in the welterweight division. In 1945 he won a singing contest at the Million Dollar Theater, covering "There's No You", originally recorded by Bing Crosby. In 1946, Brown moved to Galveston, Texas, where he sang in Joe Coleman's group, performing mostly songs from the Hit Parade, in a nightclub called the Club Granada. His repertoire included "Good Rockin' Tonight".

After being rejected by the United States Armed Forces because of flat feet, Brown secured his first major job in a club in Shreveport, Louisiana, singing mostly pop ballads, such as "Stardust" and "There's No You". The owner of Bill Riley's Palace Park hired him, as Brown told an interviewer for Blues Unlimited, because of his appeal as "a Negro singer who sounds white." It was at the Palace Park that Brown started developing a blues repertoire, learning contemporary R&B tunes such as "Jelly Jelly" (recorded by Billy Eckstine). He returned to New Orleans in 1947, where he performed at the Dew Drop Inn.

== Career ==
Brown was a fan of blues singer Wynonie Harris. When Harris appeared in town, Brown tried but failed to interest him in listening to "Good Rockin' Tonight". Brown then approached another blues singer, Cecil Gant, who was performing at another club in town. Brown introduced his song, and Gant had him sing it over the telephone to the president of De Luxe Records, Jules Braun, reportedly at 4:00 in the morning. Brown was signed to a recording contract immediately. He recorded the song in a jump blues style with a swing beat. It was released in 1948 and reached number 13 on the Billboard R&B chart. Ironically, Harris recorded a cover version of the song, and his version rose to the top of the Billboard R&B chart later in 1948. Presley also covered the song for Sun Records in 1954; it was re-released by RCA Victor when his recording contract was sold to that label in 1956. According to the Paul McCartney Project, "the song has also been credited with being the most successful record to that point to use the word 'rock' not as a euphemism for sex, but as a descriptive for the musical style.

Brown continued to make his mark on the R&B charts, having 14 hits for De Luxe from mid-1948 to late 1951, including the million-selling, "Hard Luck Blues" (1950, his biggest seller), "Love Don't Love Nobody", "Rockin' at Midnight", "Boogie at Midnight", "Miss Fanny Brown", and "Cadillac Baby", making him, along with Harris, one of the top R&B performers in those three years. One source suggests that Brown was the "best selling R&B artist from 1949-51". Another states that during 1948–51, "he had 15 records on the charts". A third source adds that Brown "chalked up a dozen top 10s".

After his popularity had peaked, Brown began to experience a lull in his career. Doo-wop and R&B groups were quickly gaining popularity as the standard sound of R&B in the early to mid-1950s. His declining fortune coincided with the resolution of a lawsuit against King Records for unpaid royalties in 1952, in which Brown prevailed, one of the few African-American musicians to do so in the 1950s. This coincidence has led some, such as writer Nick Tosches (in his book Unsung Heroes of Rock 'n' Roll, which contains a chapter on Brown) to believe that Brown may have been blacklisted. Brown's other misfortunes included trouble with the Internal Revenue Service. When confronted by the government for unpaid taxes he owed, he approached Elvis Presley for help. Presley wrote him a check on a brown paper bag, but it was not enough to keep Brown out of prison for tax evasion.

In 1951, Brown performed at the seventh famed Cavalcade of Jazz concert held at Wrigley Field in Los Angeles which was produced by Leon Hefflin, Sr. on July 8. Also featured were Lionel Hampton and his Revue, Percy Mayfield, Jimmy Witherspoon, Joe Liggins' Honeydrippers and Billy Eckstine. The following year, June 1, 1952, he performed for the eighth Cavalcade of Jazz concert with His Mighty Men. Also featured that day were Anna Mae Winburn and Her Sweethearts, Jerry Wallace, Toni Harper, Louis Jordan, Jimmy Witherspoon and Josephine Baker. And Brown came back in 1953 to play at the 9th Cavalcade of Jazz on June 7. Also featured that day were, Don Tosti and His Mexican Jazzmen, Earl Bostic, Nat "King" Cole, Shorty Rogers and his Giants, and Louis Armstrong and his All Stars with Velma Middleton.

Brown had a brief comeback on Imperial Records in 1957. Working with Dave Bartholomew, he returned to the charts with the original version of "Let the Four Winds Blow", co-written with Fats Domino, who would later have a hit with it.

Brown returned to King Records, but his popularity had diminished by 1959. He found sporadic work, performing wherever he was wanted, and he made some recordings through the 1960s. To supplement his income, he sold the rights to "Good Rockin' Tonight". "I was selling door to door," he reminisced, referring to his stint as an encyclopedia salesman.

In 1970, Brown closed The Johnny Otis Show at the Monterey Jazz Festival. As a result of the positive reception by the audience, he recorded "Love for Sale", which became a hit for Mercury Records.

== Later life and death ==
In the late 1970s, a compilation album of his old recordings brought about a minor revival of interest in his music. In 1978, he made a successful tour in Scandinavia following the releases of Laughing but Crying and Good Rockin' Tonight. Shortly before his death he performed at the Whisky a Go Go in West Hollywood, California, and he was a headliner at the New Orleans Jazz and Heritage Festival in 1981, dying a month later.

According to The Guardian, "in 1952 he attempted to sue his manager for unpaid royalties, but succeeded only in getting himself blackballed from the music industry. He spent much of his life as a door-to-door encyclopedia salesman". In truth, he made a comeback in 1970, performing at the Monterey Jazz Festival; he continued touring for "the rest of the decade", including a tour of Europe in 1978.

Brown died of a heart attack on May 25, 1981, at Pacoima Lutheran Memorial Hospital, near his home in the San Fernando Valley. The Reverend Johnny Otis conducted the funeral service.

Years later, Little Richard said that Roy Brown had been one of the artists that inspired him in the early years.

== Legacy ==
Brown was posthumously inducted into the Blues Hall of Fame in 1981.

Two of his songs, "Butcher Pete, Pt. 1" and "Mighty Mighty Man" are featured in the 2008 video game, Fallout 3. "Butcher Pete, Pt. 1", "Butcher Pete, Pt. 2", "Good Rockin' Tonight", and "Mighty Mighty Man" are featured in the 2015 sequel, Fallout 4. There is a quest named after his song "Hard Luck Blues" in the video game Fallout: New Vegas.

== Discography ==
=== Chart singles ===
| Year | Single | Chart Positions | |
| Year | Single | US Pop | US R&B |
|---|---|---|---|
| 1947 | "Good Rockin' Tonight" | – | 13 |
| 1947 | "'Long About Midnight" | – | 1 |
| 1949 | "Rainy Weather Blues" / "'Fore Day in the Morning" | – | 5 / 6 |
| 1949 | "Rockin' at Midnight" | – | 2 |
| 1949 | "Miss Fanny Brown" | – | 8 |
| 1949 | "Please Don't Go (Come Back Baby)" | – | 9 |
| 1949 | "Boogie at Midnight" | – | 3 |
| 1950 | "Hard Luck Blues" | – | 1 |
| 1950 | "Love Don't Love Nobody" | – | 2 |
| 1950 | "Cadillac Baby" / "'Long About Sundown" | – | 6 / 8 |
| 1951 | "Big Town" | – | 8 |
| 1951 | "Bar Room Blues" | – | 6 |
| 1957 | "Party Doll" | 89 | 13 |
| 1957 | "Let the Four Winds Blow" | 29 | 5 |

=== Original 10" shellac (78-rpm) and 7" vinyl (45-rpm) releases ===
- Gold Star 636, "Deep Sea Diver" / "Bye Baby Bye", 1947
- DeLuxe 1093, "Good Rockin Tonight" / "Lolly Pop Mama", 1947
- DeLuxe 1098, "Special Lesson No. 1" / "Woman's a Wonderful Thing", 1947
- DeLuxe 1107, "Roy Brown Boogie" / "Please Don't Go (Come Back Baby)", 1947
- DeLuxe 1128, "Mighty Mighty Man" / "Miss Fanny Brown", 1947
- DeLuxe 1154, "Long About Midnight" / "Whose Hat Is That", 1948
- DeLuxe 1166, "All My Love Belongs to You" / "Ebony Rhapsody" (B-side by Ethel Morris), 1948
- DeLuxe 3093, "Good Rockin' Tonight" / "Lolly Pop Mama" (reissue), 1950 (also issued as Miltone 3093)
- DeLuxe 3098, "Special Lesson No. 1" / "Woman's a Wonderful Thing" (reissue), 1950
- DeLuxe 3107, "Roy Brown Boogie" / "Please Don't Go (Come Back Baby)" (reissue), 1950
- DeLuxe 3128, "Mighty Mighty Man" / "Miss Fanny Brown" (reissue), 1950
- DeLuxe 3154, "Long About Midnight" / "Whose Hat Is That" (reissue), 1950 (also issued as Miltone 3154)
- DeLuxe 3166, "All My Love Belongs to You" / "Ebony Rhapsody" (B-side by Ethel Morris) (reissue), 1950
- DeLuxe 3189, "Miss Fanny Brown Returns" / "Roy Brown Boogie", 1948
- DeLuxe 3198, "Fore Day in the Morning" / "Rainy Weather Blues", 1948 (also issued as Miltone 3198)
- DeLuxe 3212, "Rockin' at Midnight" / "Judgement Day Blues", 1949
- DeLuxe 3226, "Please Don't Go (Come Back Baby)" / "Riding High", 1949
- DeLuxe 3300, "Boogie at Midnight" / "The Blues Got Me Again", 1949
- DeLuxe 3301, "Butcher Pete, Part 1" / "Butcher Pete, Part 2", 1949
- DeLuxe 3302, "I Feel That Young Man's Rhythm" / "End of My Journey" 1949
- DeLuxe 3304, "Hard Luck Blues" / "New Rebecca" 1950
- DeLuxe 3306, "Dreaming Blues" / "Love Don't Love Nobody", 1950
- DeLuxe 3308, "Long About Sundown" / "Cadillac Baby", 1950
- DeLuxe 3311, "Double Crossin' Woman" / "Teen Age Jamboree", 1951
- DeLuxe 3312, "Sweet Peach" / "Good Man Blues", 1951
- DeLuxe 3313, "Beautician Blues" / "Wrong Woman Blues", 1951
- DeLuxe 3318, "Train Time Blues" / "Big Town", 1951
- DeLuxe 3319, "Bar Room Blues" / "Good Rockin' Man", 1951
- DeLuxe 3323, "Brown Angel" / "I've Got the Last Laugh Now", 1952
- King 4602, "Hurry Hurry Baby" / "Travelin' Man", 1953
- King 4609. "Grandpa Stole My Baby" / "Money Can't Buy Love", 1953
- King 4627, "Mr. Hound Dog's in Town" / "Gamblin' Man", 1953
- King 4637, "Old Age Boogie, Part 1" / "Old Age Boogie, Part 2", 1953
- King 4654, "Laughing but Crying" / "Crazy Crazy Women", 1953
- King 4669, "Caldonia's Wedding Day" / "A Fool in Love", 1953
- King 4684, "Midnight Lover Man" / "Letter from Home", 1953
- King 4689, "Everything's Alright" / "Lonesome Lover", 1953
- King 4704, "Bootleggin' Baby" / "Trouble at Midnight", 1954
- King 4715, "Up Jumped the Devil" / "This Is My Last Goodbye", 1954
- King 4722, "Don't Let It Rain" / "No Love at All", 1954
- King 4731, "Ain't It a Shame" / "Gal from Kokomo", 1954
- King 4743, "Worried Life Blues" / "Black Diamond", 1954
- King 4761, "Fannie Brown Got Married" / "Queen of Diamonds", 1954
- King 4816, "Shake 'Em Up Baby" / "Letter to Baby", 1955
- King 4834, "She's Gone Too Long" / "My Little Angel Child", 1955
- Imperial 5422, "Saturday Night (That's My Night)" / "Everybody", 1956
- Imperial 5427, "Party Doll" / "I'm Stickin' with You", 1957
- Imperial 5439, "Let the Four Winds Blow" / "Diddy-Y-Diddy-O", 1957
- Imperial 5455, "I'm Convicted of Love" / "I'm Ready to Play", 1957
- Imperial 5469, "The Tick of the Clock" / "Slow Down Little Eva", 1957
- Imperial 5489, "Ain't Gonna Do It" / "Sail on Little Girl", 1958
- Imperial 5510, "Hip Shakin' Baby" / "Be My Love Tonight", 1958
- Imperial 5969, "Let the Four Winds Blow" / "Diddy-Yi-Diddy-Yo" (reissue), 1963
- King 5178, "La-Dee-Dah-Dee" / "Melinda", 1959
- King 5207, "Rinky Dinky Doo" / "I Never Had It So Good", 1959
- King 5218, "Good Looking and Foxy Too" / "Hard Luck Blues, 1959
- King 5247, "School Bell Rock" / "Ain't No Rocking No More", 1959
- King 5333, "Ain't Got No Blues Today" / "Adorable One", 1960
- King 5521, "Mighty Mighty Man" / "Good Man Blues", 1962
- Home of the Blues 107, "A Man with the Blues" / "Don't Break My Heart", 1960
- Home of the Blues 110, "Rocking All the Time" / "Tired of Being Alone", 1960
- Home of the Blues 115, "Sugar Baby" / "Oh So Wonderful", 1961
- Home of the Blues 122, "Rock and Roll Jamboree" / "I Need a Friend", 1961
- Dra 321, "Goliath" / "Stop the Twist", 1962
- Summit 1001, "She's Alright" / "Let the Four Winds Blow", 1963
- ABC-Bluesway 61002, "New Orleans Women" / "Standing on Broadway (Watching the Girls)", 1967
- Gert 11123, "Baby It's Love" / "Going Home" 1968
- Gert 400, "The Message" / "Great Casaboo", 1968
- Tru-Love 448, "Good Sweet Loving" / "Separation Blues", 1968
- Tru-Love 449, "I'm Making Love" / "Rocks Is My Pillow", 1968
- Connie 303/304, "Young Blood Twist" / "I Love a Woman ", 1969
- Friendship 701, "It's My Fault Darling" / "Love for Sale", 1970
- Mercury 73166, "Love for Sale" / "It's My Fault Darling" (reissue), 1970
- Mercury 73219, "Hunky Funky Woman" / "Mail Man Blues", 1971
- Mobile Fidelity Productions MFP-2, "in the Eyes of My People" / "You've Got a Friend", 1972
- Topflight 103, "Hard Times" / "Separation Blues", 19??

=== LP releases of note ===
- King 536, Rock 'n' Roll Dance Party, various artists (including Brown), 1956
- King 607, Battle of the Blues, album shared with Wynonie Harris, 1958
- King 627, Battle of the Blues, Volume 2, album shared with Wynonie Harris 1959
- King 668, Battle of the Blues, Volume 4, album shared with Eddie Cleanhead Vinson and Wynonie Harris, 1959
- King 956, Roy Brown Sings 24 Hits, 2-LP set, 1966
- ABC-Bluesway BLS-6019, The Blues Are All Brown, 1968
- ABC-Bluesway BLS-6056, Hard Times: The Classic Blues of Roy Brown, 1973, same as BLS-6019
- King KS-1130, Hard Luck Blues, 1976
- Gusto GD-5036X, Hard Luck Blues, 2-LP set, 1976
- Route 66 KIX-2, Laughing but Crying, recorded 1947–1959, released 1977
- Route 66 KIX-6, Good Rockin' Tonight, recorded 1947–1954, released 1978
- Friendship RB-701, We Came to Party, 1978
- Faith 91020, Cheapest Price in Town, 1978
- Solid Smoke SS-8009, San Francisco Blues Festival, Vol. 1, album shared with Lowell Fulson (one side for each), 1981
- Mr. R&B 104, Saturday Nite, recorded 1952–1959, released 1984
- Route 66 KIX-26, I Feel That Young Man's Rhythm, recorded 1947–1955, released 1985
- Charly CRB-1093, Boogie at Midnight, recorded 1947–1959, released 1985

=== CD releases of note ===
- Ace CHD-459, Mighty Mighty Man!, recorded 1953–1955 and 1959 for King Records, released 1993
- Rhino 71545, Good Rockin' Tonight: The Best of Roy Brown, recorded 1947–1957, released 1994
- Capitol-EMI 31743, The Complete Imperial Recordings, recorded 1956–1958 for Imperial Records, released 1995
- Classics (Blues & Rhythm Series) 5021, The Chronological Roy Brown 1947–1949, released 2002
- Classics (Blues & Rhythm Series) 5036, The Chronological Roy Brown 1950–1951, released 2002
- Classics (Blues & Rhythm Series) 5090, The Chronological Roy Brown 1951–1953, released 2004
- Collectables 2882, Rockin' at Midnight: The Very Best of Roy Brown, recorded 1947–1959, released 2004
- Ace CHD-1072, Good Rockin' Brown: The King & DeLuxe Acetate Series, recorded 1947 for DeLuxe Records, released 2005
- Fantastic Voyage FVDD-123, Good Rockin' Man: The Definitive Collection, 2-CD set, recorded 1947–1960, released 2011
- Jasmine JASMCD-3098, Good Rockin' Tonight: All His Greatest Hits + Selected Singles As & Bs 1947–1958, 2-CD set, released 2018

== See also ==
- List of artists who reached number one on the Billboard R&B chart
- List of blues musicians
- List of jump blues musicians
- West Coast blues
