= Trouble Blues (song) =

Single by Charles Brown
- B-side: "Honey Keep Your Mind on Me"
- Released: March 1949
- Recorded: Radio Recorders, Los Angeles; January 14, 1949
- Genre: Blues
- Length: 2:21
- Label: Aladdin (Cat. no. 3024)
- Songwriter(s): Charles Brown

Charles Brown singles chronology
"Long Time" (1949)	"Trouble Blues" (1949)	"In the Evening when the Sun Goes Down" (1949)

"Trouble Blues" is a 1949 single by The Charles Brown Trio. The single was the most successful of the trio's career and peaked at number one on the R&B chart for fifteen weeks. At fifteen weeks on the R&B Best Sellers chart, "Trouble Blues" was the most successful R&B song of the year.

Brown re-recorded the song for his 1972 Blues 'n' Brown album.
