= Amos Milburn =

American R&B singer and pianist (1927–1980)

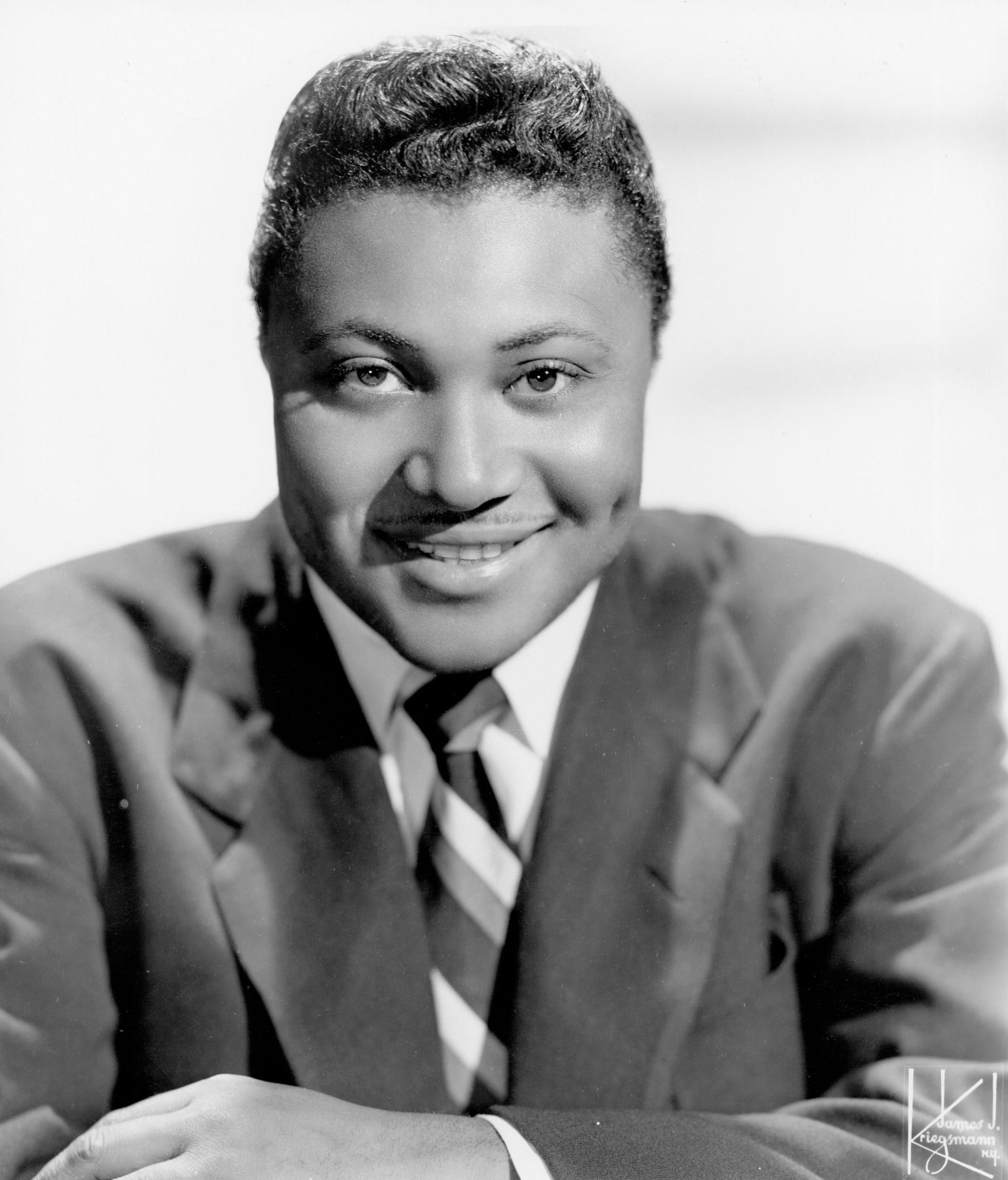
- Milburn c. 1955

Background information
- Born: April 1, 1927; Houston, Texas, U.S.
- Died: January 3, 1980 (aged 52) Houston, Texas, U.S.
- Genres: Rhythm and blues, boogie-woogie, jump blues Urban Blues
- Occupations: Singer, pianist
- Instruments: Vocals; piano
- Years active: 1946–1972
- Label: Aladdin

Joseph Amos Milburn (April 1, 1927 – January 3, 1980) was an American R&B singer and pianist, popular in the 1940s and 1950s. One commentator noted, "Milburn excelled at good-natured, upbeat romps about booze and partying, imbued with a vibrant sense of humour and double entendre, as well as vivid, down-home imagery in his lyrics."

== Life and career ==
Milburn was born in Houston, one of 13 children. By the age of five, he was playing tunes on the piano. He enlisted in the United States Navy when he was aged 15. He returned to Houston and organized a 16-piece band playing in clubs in the city. He was managed by William and Geneva Church.

Milburn was a polished pianist and performer and, in 1946, attracted the attention of a woman who arranged a recording session with Aladdin Records in Los Angeles. Milburn's relationship with Aladdin lasted eight years, during which he recorded more than 75 sides. This included his cover version of "Down the Road a Piece" (1946), a blues song with a Texas boogie, that is similar in many respects to rock music. However, none of his recordings were popular until 1949, when seven of his singles got the attention of the R&B audience. "Hold Me Baby" and "Chicken Shack Boogie" reached numbers eight and nine on Billboard's survey of 1949's R&B best-sellers.

He became one of the main performers associated with the Central Avenue music scene in Los Angeles. He was also a popular touring artist. He won awards from Down Beat magazine (Best Blues and Jazz Star) and Billboard magazine (Top R&B Artist). Among his best-known songs was "One Scotch, One Bourbon, One Beer". In 1950 his recording of Maxwell Davis' "Bad, Bad Whiskey", reached the top of the R&B record chart. It was the first of a series of drinking songs he recorded (none written by Milburn, but several composed by Rudy Toombs). However, there is no evidence that he had an alcohol problem.

Milburn recorded several more drinking songs through 1952 ("Thinking and Drinking", "Trouble in Mind") and was by then touring the country playing clubs. While touring the Midwest that summer, he announced that he would disband his combo and continue as a solo act. In autumn he joined Charles Brown for a concert tour of the South. For the next few years each of his tours was a series of one-nighters. After three years of solo performing, Milburn returned to Houston in 1956 to re-form his band. His releases for Aladdin Records in 1957 did not sell well, and the record company, having its own problems, terminated his contract. He tried to regain commercial success with a few more releases for Ace Records, but his time had passed. Radio airplay was directed at the teenage market.

Milburn contributed two songs to the R&B Yuletide canon: "Let's Make Christmas Merry, Baby", in 1949, for Aladdin Records, and "Christmas (Comes but Once a Year)", in 1960, for King Records. The latter was the B-side of Brown's holiday classic "Please Come Home for Christmas".

Milburn's final recording was for an album by Johnny Otis in 1977, after Milburn had been impaired by a stroke. Otis played the left-hand piano parts for his enfeebled old friend. Milburn had a second stroke, which caused circulatory problems resulting in the amputation of a leg. He died soon after, of a third stroke, at the age of 52. He was interred as Amos Milburn Jr. at Houston National Cemetery on January 7, 1980.

Another artist performing and recording as Amos Milburn Jr. in Texas in the 1960s was a different and unrelated person (James Thomas Russ Jr.).

== Legacy ==
Milburn was an important performer of blues music in the years immediately after World War II. He was one of the first performers to switch from sophisticated jazz arrangements to the louder jump blues style. He began to emphasize rhythm and technical qualities of voice and instrumentation second. He was a commercial success for 11 years and influenced many performers. His energetic songs about getting "high" were admired by fellow musicians, such as Little Willie Littlefield, Floyd Dixon and Milburn's prime disciple, Fats Domino. Domino consistently credited Milburn as an influence on his music.

== Discography ==
=== Selected recordings ===
- "After Midnite", 1946
- "Amos Blues", 1946
- "Down the Road a Piece", 1947
- "Chicken Shack Boogie", 1948
- "Bewildered", 1948
- "A and M Blues", 1948
- "Hold Me Baby", 1949
- "In the Middle of the Night", 1949
- "Roomin' House Boogie", 1949
- "Let's Make Christmas Merry, Baby", 1949
- "Sax Shack Boogie", 1950
- "Bad, Bad Whiskey", 1950
- "Let's Rock A While", 1951
- "Trouble in Mind", 1952
- "Thinking and Drinking", 1952 (written by Rudy Toombs)
- "Let Me Go Home, Whiskey", 1953 (written by Shifty Henry)
- "One Scotch, One Bourbon, One Beer", 1953 (written by Rudy Toombs)
- "Good, Good Whiskey", 1953
- "Let's Have a Party", 1953
- "Vicious, Vicious Vodka", 1954

=== LPs ===
- Rockin' the Boogie, 1952, Aladdin Records [10-inch LP]
- Let's Have a Party, 1957, Score Records
- Million Sellers, 1962, Imperial Records
- The Return of the Blues Boss, 1963, Motown Records
- Great Rhythm & Blues Oldies, Volume 10: Amos Milburn, 1977, Blues Spectrum

=== Compilation albums ===
- The Best of Amos Milburn: Down the Road Apiece, CD, 1993, EMI America Records
- The Complete Aladdin Recordings of Amos Milburn, 7-CD box set, 1994, Mosaic Records
- Blues, Barrelhouse & Boogie Woogie: The Best of Amos Milburn 1946-1955, 3-CD box set, 1996, Capitol Records
- The Best of Amos Milburn, CD, 2001, EMI-Capitol Special Markets
- The Original Blues Sound of Charles Brown & Amos Milburn, with Jackie Shane, and Bob Marshall & the Crystals, LP, 1965, (Pickwick/Grand Prix Series, Pickwick International)

== See also ==
- Blues Hall of Fame
- First rock and roll record
- Houston National Cemetery
- List of artists who reached number one on the Billboard R&B chart
- List of blues musicians
- List of jump blues musicians
- List of keyboardists
- List of R&B musicians
- List of West Coast blues musicians
- Route 66 Records
- West Coast blues
