= Songbook (Mark Murphy album) =

1999 compilation album by Mark Murphy

Compilation album by Mark Murphy
- Released: 1999
- Recorded: 1972–1991
- Genre: Vocal jazz
- Label: 32 Jazz
- Producer: Michael Bourne

Songbook is a compilation album of American jazz vocalist Mark Murphy's Muse Records recordings. It was released by the 32 Jazz label in the United States in 1999. This album is a collection of songs from his Muse years 1972–1991.

== Background ==
Muse Records was founded by Joe Fields in 1972. Fields sold the label in 1996 to Joel Dorn who released four compilation albums from Mark Murphy's Muse catalogue on the 32 Jazz label, Stolen...And Other Moments, Jazz Standards, Songbook, and Mark Murphy Sings Nat King Cole & More. Writer and broadcaster Michael Bourne put together the four collections.

This release collects standards recorded by Murphy on his Muse albums covering the years of the Great American Songbook and beyond. Murphy often recorded the rarely heard introduction to these songs, as well as uncommonly recorded alternate verses. For example, on "Body and Soul" from Mark Murphy Sings, Murphy explains, "I think I heard the verse on a Billie Holiday record, and I heard the particular chorus lyric on a Morgana King record, and I just put them together. I hadn't heard these lyrics to it in years by anybody, and we gave it a little 6/8 feel. It came out like a new song." Similarly, he records the rarely heard introduction to "As Time Goes By". And on "I Can't Get Started" he sings lyrics that Ira Gershwin wrote years after the song debuted in the Ziegfeld Follies of 1936.

Murphy explains his approach, "I'm not a stylist. A stylist is typed and non fluid. I'm fluid. Every time I open my mouth to sing, it comes out somewhat differently. It actually helps me to deal with each respective audience because l've learned to read audiences. I can readily tell what's happening and what they want. Whereas a stylist comes out to sing and if the audience doesn't like it, he/she is stuck, because they can't do anything else to adapt to the demands for change".

According to Michael Bourne, Murphy particularly wanted "Again" from Stolen Moments included in the collection. Murphy said, "I use a 12/8 feel on the drums on the ballads, allowing me to do it incredibly slow. Yet it doesn't drag. You completely go with the word 'slow' or you go with the word 'fast.' There is nothing in between. There isn't kind of slow or kind of fast. Hey just listen to the words. It's all there".

Four Brazilian jazz standards are also contained in this collection from composers Antônio Carlos Jobim, Milton Nascimento, and Ivan Lins. Murphy not only recorded many over the years but also featured them in his live performances. He often devoted his second set of a nightclub engagement exclusively to Brazilian songs. Murphy said, "I don't hear much new material that knocks me out. The best songs now being written are coming from Brazil. It's almost as though they've written into the Brazilian Constitution that it is illegal to write a bad song".

A tribute to the lyricist Johnny Mercer is also included, "Miss You Mr. Mercer". Murphy said, "I always really loved Johnny Mercer, not only his lyrics but the fact that he was a genius and he could sing almost as good as Nat King Cole, which is as good as you can get".

Professional ratings
Review scores
Source	Rating
AllMusic	4.5/5 stars

== Reception ==
Jason Elias, writing for AllMusic, says: "This compilation has Murphy coming into his own (around the early '70s) as a dramatic and often flawless stylist". He calls the collection, "an excellent compilation that presents some of the finest and sometimes most emotionally draining of one of music's most talented and eclectic singers". He praises the compilation for finding definitive performances, singling out the tracks "Triad", "How Are You Dreaming?", "No More", "Again", "We'll Be Together Again", "The Island", "Nothing Will Be as It Was Tomorrow", and "I Fall in Love Too Easily".

Scott Yanow says this release is "excellent" in his book The Jazz Singers: The Ultimate Guide.

In his book A Biographical Guide to the Great Jazz and Pop Singers, Will Friedwald says the four Muse anthologies issued by Joel Dorn show "the astonishing range and scope, not to mention sheer size, of the singer's seventies and eighties output". The releases reveal "his output has been so consistently excellent—that so many of these records deserve to be regarded, in retrospect, as classics of the jazz vocal genre—and that even his occasional missteps are instructive".

== Track listing ==
Disc one
No.	Title	Lyrics	Music	Album	Length
1.	"As Time Goes By"	Herman Hupfeld	Hupfeld	Bridging a Gap	3:03
2.	"No More"	Bob Russell	Tutti Camarata	Bridging a Gap	3:16
3.	"Again"	Dorcas Cochran	Lionel Newman	Stolen Moments	3:31
4.	"We'll Be Together Again"	Frankie Laine	Carl T. Fischer	Stolen Moments	3:40
5.	"Don't Go To Strangers / Don't Misunderstand"	Redd Evans / Gordon Parks	Arthur Kent, David Mann / Parks	Satisfaction Guaranteed	5:42
6.	"All the Things You Are"	Oscar Hammerstein II	Jerome Kern	Satisfaction Guaranteed	6:01
7.	"Body and Soul"	Frank Eyton, Edward Heyman, Robert Sour	Johnny Green	Mark Murphy Sings	5:20
8.	"I Can't Get Started"	Ira Gershwin	Vernon Duke	Beauty and the Beast	6:28
9.	"Desafinado"	Newton Mendonça	Antônio Carlos Jobim	Brazil Song (Cancões Do Brasil)	3:54
10.	"The Island"	Alan Bergman, Marilyn Bergman, Vítor Martins	Jobim	Brazil Song	4:06
11.	"Bridges"	Fernando Brant, Gene Lees	Milton Nascimento	Brazil Song	4:07
12.	"Nothing Will Be as It Was Tomorrow"	Ronaldo Bastos, Rene Vincent	Nascimento	Brazil Song	3:55
13.	"The Bad and the Beautiful"	Dory Previn	David Raksin	Bop for Kerouac	3:51
14.	"You'd Better Go Now"	Bix Reichner	Irvin Graham	Bop for Kerouac	3:26
15.	"The Night We Called It a Day / There's No You"	Tom Adair / Adair	Matt Dennis / Hal Hopper	Kerouac, Then and Now	7:41
16.	"Lazy Afternoon"	John La Touche	Jerome Moross	Kerouac, Then and Now	4:54

Disc two
No.	Title	Lyrics	Music	Album	Length
1.	"We Could Be Flying"	Paul Williams	Michel Colombier	Bridging A Gap	3:44
2.	"Steamroller"	James Taylor	Taylor	Bridging a Gap	3:19
3.	"Triad"	David Crosby	Crosby	Mark II	4:34
4.	"How Are You Dreaming?"	Allan Shatkin	Bob Crewe	Mark Murphy Sings	4:35
5.	"Don't Be Blue"	Michael Franks	John Guerin	Stolen Moments	3:38
6.	"Eleanor Rigby"	John Lennon, Paul McCartney	Lennon, McCartney	Satisfaction Guaranteed	5:33
7.	"Close Enough for Love"	Paul Williams	Johnny Mandel	The Artistry of Mark Murphy	5:09
8.	"Autumn Nocturne"	Kim Gannon	Josef Myrow	The Artistry of Mark Murphy	3:53
9.	"Outubro"	Brant	Nascimento	Brazil Song	4:05
10.	"Our Love Rolls On"	Dave Frishberg	Frishberg	Living Room	4:10
11.	"What a Way to Go"	June Tonkin	June Tonkin	What a Way to Go	6:09
12.	"I Fall in Love Too Easily"	Sammy Cahn	Jule Styne	What a Way to Go	4:15
13.	"All My Tomorrows"	Cahn	Jimmy Van Heusen	What a Way to Go	6:03
14.	"I'll Close My Eyes"	Buddy Kaye	Billy Reid	I'll Close My Eyes	5:39
15.	"Miss You Mr. Mercer"	Jack Segal	Duncan Lamont	I'll Close My Eyes	5:08
16.	"The Best Thing for You"	Irving Berlin	Berlin	One for Junior	4:42
Total length:					2:27:31

== Personnel ==
Production

- Michael Bourne – compilation producer, liner notes
- Gene Paul – mastering
- Page Simon – graphic design
- Nancy Dwyer – graphic design
- Becky Wisdom – production coordinator
- Joel Dorn – series producer
