= Stolen...And Other Moments =

Compilation album by Mark Murphy
- Released: 1997
- Recorded: 1972–1991
- Genre: Vocal jazz
- Length: 2:28:53
- Label: 32 Jazz
- Producer: Michael Bourne

Mark Murphy chronology
| Song for the Geese (1997) | Stolen...And Other Moments (1997) | Some Time Ago (1999) |

Stolen...And Other Moments is a compilation album of American jazz vocalist Mark Murphy's Muse Records recordings. It was released by the 32 Jazz label in the United States in 1997. This album is collection of songs from his Muse years from 1972 to 1991.

== Background ==
Muse Records was founded by Joe Fields. Fields sold the label to Joel Dorn who released four compilation albums from Mark Murphy's Muse catalogue on the 32 Jazz label, Stolen...And Other Moments, Jazz Standards, Songbook, and Mark Murphy Sings Nat King Cole & More.

== Reception ==
Professional ratings
Review scores
| Source | Rating |
|---|---|
| The Rolling Stone Jazz & Blues Album Guide | 4.5/5 stars |
| The Virgin Encyclopedia of Popular Music | 4/5 stars |
| AllMusic | 4.5/5 stars |
| Stereo Review | 5/5 stars |

John Bush assigns 4.5 stars to the album at AllMusic. He said, "Murphy never stopped growing as a singer -- he always challenged himself in his material, his projects, and his performances throughout the 20-year span covered on this 1972-1991 compilation, the best document of him as a jazz singer". He singles out "I'm Glad There Is You" as an excellent example of a straight reading of a standard, "Red Clay" as an example of his ability to write his own vocalese lyrics, "Ding Walls" as an example of his abilities as a composer, and calls his interpretation of "Waters of March (Aguas de Março)" definitive.

Scott Yanow says, "Stolen...And Other Moments" (32 Jazz) is a definitive retrospective of his 1972-91 recordings and Jazz Standards".

The Rolling Stone Jazz & Blues Album Guide assigns the release 4.5 stars. (This means between 5 stars which is "Classic: Albums in this category are essential listening for anyone interested in the artist under discussion or the style of music that artist's work represents", and 4 stars, "excellent: Four-star albums represent peak performances in an artist's career. Generally speaking, albums that are granted four or more stars constitute the best introductions to an artist's work for listeners who are curious").

The Virgin Encyclopedia of Popular Music assigns the album 4 stars. (This means, "Excellent. A high standard album from this artist and therefore highly recommended)."

Assessing Murphy's recorded legacy from Muse Records in his book A Biographical Guide to the Great Jazz and Pop Singers, Will Friedwald writes that one point the four Muse anthologies issued by Joel Dorn make "immediately is the astonishing range and scope, not to mention sheer size, of the singer's seventies and eighties output. Other than Helen Merrill and Sheila Jordan (neither of whom is quite as consistently interesting as Murphy), no other pure jazz singer was so prolific in these years". Friedwald goes on to say the releases reveal, "his output has been so consistently excellent—that so many of these records deserve to be regarded, in retrospect, as classics of the jazz vocal genre—and that even his occasional missteps are instructive". Regarding his performances of the Great American Songbook, Friedwald says he re-infuses "them with swing, energy and feeling". He points out that Murphy also covers numerous songs that originated with jazz composers, vocalese songs, bossa nova, and even contributes his own lyrics and original compositions.

Will Friedwald assigns the release 5 stars in Stereo Review and says the release "summarizes the nineteen albums and twenty two years Murphy spent with Muse records; it's a gloriously varied program with sources of inspiration ranging from Antonio Carlos Jobim to Nat King Cole to Jack Kerouac. As colleague Sheila Jordan observes in the liner notes, 'What's not to like? What singers do what Mark Murphy does'?"

In the Washington Post Mike Joyce said, "The affinity he's developed over the years for Brazilian music is documented here, along with his penchant for the writings of Jack Kerouac and his gift for taking a jazz instrumental, such as Freddie Hubbard's "Red Clay," and equipping it with his own wonderfully compatible vocalese lyrics".

== Track listing ==
Disc one: Murphy Muses

| No. | Title | Writer(s) | Album | Length |
|---|---|---|---|---|
| 1. | "I'm Glad There Is You" | Jimmy Dorsey, Paul Madeira | Bridging a Gap | 5:03 |
| 2. | "Looking For Another Pure Love" | Stevie Wonder, Syreeta | Mark II | 3:05 |
| 3. | "Empty Faces (Vera Cruz)" | Lani Hall, Milton Nascimento | Mark Murphy Sings | 5:15 |
| 4. | "Young and Foolish" | Albert Hague, Arnold Horwitt | Mark Murphy Sings | 2:49 |
| 5. | "Waters of March" | Antônio Carlos Jobim | Stolen Moments | 3:38 |
| 6. | "Like a Lover (O Cantador)" | Dori Caymmi, Nelson Motta, Alan Bergman, Marilyn Bergman | Stolen Moments | 5:40 |
| 7. | "Satisfaction Guaranteed" | Michael Franks | Satisfaction Guaranteed | 5:22 |
| 8. | "Medley: Long Ago (and Far Away) / Long Ago and Far Away" | Jerome Kern, Ira Gershwin / James Taylor | The Artistry of Mark Murphy | 4:05 |
| 9. | "I Don’t Want to Cry Anymore" | Victor Schertzinger | The Artistry of Mark Murphy | 6:33 |
| 10. | "Two Kites" | Jobim | Brazil Song (Cancões Do Brasil) | 3:36 |
| 11. | "Someone to Light Up My Life" | Jobim, Vinicius de Moraes, Gene Lees | | 2:57 |
| 12. | "Until the Real Thing Comes Along / Baby Baby All the Time" | Sammy Cahn, Saul Chaplin, L.E. Freeman, Mann Holiner, Alberta Nichols / Bobby Troup | Mark Murphy Sings the Nat "King" Cole Songbook, Volume One | 6:20 |
| 13. | "Go Shopping" | Billy Austin, Sheldon Smith | Mark Murphy Sings Nat's Choice: The Nat "King" Cole Songbook, Volume Two | 4:12 |
| 14. | "Lord Buckley" | Lord Buckley, Bill Mays | Kerouac, Then and Now | 3:12 |
| 15. | "Ding Walls" | Mark Murphy | What a Way to Go | 2:48 |
| 16. | "Where You At?" | Jack Segal, George Handy | One for Junior | 6:24 |
| 17. | "Time on My Hands" | Harold Adamson, Mack Gordon, Vincent Youmans | I'll Close My Eyes | 4:05 |

Disc two: Mark, Jack, Jazz

| No. | Title | Writer(s) | Album | Length |
|---|---|---|---|---|
| 1. | "Moody's Mood" | Jimmy McHugh, James Moody, Eddie Jefferson | The Artistry Of Mark Murphy | 3:45 |
| 2. | "On the Red Clay" | Murphy, Freddie Hubbard | Mark Murphy Sings | 4:35 |
| 3. | "Stolen Moments" | Murphy, Oliver Nelson | Stolen Moments | 5:46 |
| 4. | "Beauty and the Beast" | Wayne Shorter, Murphy | Beauty and the Beast | 8:29 |
| 5. | "Cantaloupe Island" | Murphy, Herbie Hancock | Mark Murphy Sings | 5:35 |
| 6. | "The Odd Child" | George Wallington, Murphy | The Artistry Of Mark Murphy | 2:58 |
| 7. | "Be-Bop Lives (Boplicity)" | Ray Passman, Holli Ross, Miles Davis | Bop for Kerouac | 6:35 |
| 8. | "You've Proven Your Point (Bongo Beep)" | David Lahm, Charlie Parker | Bop For Kerouac | 3:41 |
| 9. | "Parker's Mood" | King Pleasure, Parker | Bop for Kerouac | 4:29 |
| 10. | "Ballad of the Sad Young Men" | Fran Landesman, Tommy Wolf | Bop for Kerouac | 7:33 |
| 11. | "San Francisco" | Mays, Jack Kerouac, Murphy | Kerouac, Then and Now | 2:10 |
| 12. | "November in the Snow" | Mays, Kerouac, Murphy | Kerouac, Then and Now | 5:00 |
| 13. | "Blood Count" | M.B. Stillman, Billy Strayhorn | Kerouac, Then and Now | 4:53 |
| 14. | "Medley: Eddie Jefferson / Take the "A" Train" | Richie Cole / Joya Sherrill, Strayhorn | Kerouac, Then and Now | 8:20 |
| Total length: | | | | 2:28:53 |

== Personnel ==
Production

- Michael Bourne – compilation producer, liner notes
- Gene Paul – mastering
- Page Simon – illustrations, graphic design
- Nancy Dwyer – graphic design
- Amy DiDonato – production coordinator
- Joel Dorn – series producer
