= Jazz Standards (Mark Murphy album) =

Compilation album by Mark Murphy
- Released: 1998
- Recorded: 1972–1991
- Genre: Vocal jazz
- Length: 2:01:11
- Label: 32 Jazz
- Producer: Michael Bourne

Mark Murphy chronology
Stolen...And Other Moments (1997)	Jazz Standards (1998)	Some Time Ago (1999)

Jazz Standards is a compilation album of American jazz vocalist Mark Murphy's Muse Records recordings. It was released by the 32 Jazz label in the United States in 1998. This album is a collection of jazz songs from his Muse years from 1972 to 1991.

== Background ==
Muse Records was founded by Joe Fields in 1972. Fields sold the label in 1996 to Joel Dorn who released four compilation albums from Mark Murphy's Muse catalogue on the 32 Jazz label, Stolen...And Other Moments, Jazz Standards, Songbook, and Mark Murphy Sings Nat King Cole & More. Writer and broadcaster Michael Bourne was enlisted to put together the four collections.

Bourne writes in the liner notes to Mark Murphy Sings that Murphy, "is a jazz singer, which is a special art. What you can do with a song instrumentally, you can't do with a song vocally, or not as much, because a song is words and music, and improvising with lyrics isn't simply grunting and singing 'baby' a lot. It's the art of knowing what the song is about, the imagery of the lyrics, the feelings, within and without the music, which Mark Murphy is a master of."

Murphy told Bourne in 1997, "Miles' lesson to me is to dare and risk. I really am improvisational. I don't know where I'm going until I go there. That's why it's hard for me to sing the same thing over — because I can't remember what I did the night before." Discussing the importance of the melody and lyrics to Murphy's approach, Murphy says, "It depends on the song. There are certain songs where the melody might be stronger than the lyric, or the lyric might be a fascinating story. There are certain songs where you don't have to improvise, but just sing it as written. You can infer improvisation by not singing at all, or rhythmically pausing, or hitting a note so squarely in tune that you create overtones. Some singers now never touch the melody. That's not interesting to me — because the composer has written something. I like to hear the melody, or at least a reference to the melody — and then you take it away."

Will Friedwald says in his book A Biographical Guide to the Great Jazz and Pop Singers, "Over the years Murphy has recorded dozens if not hundreds of songs that have originated within the world of jazz itself...There is literally no important writer of the modern and postmodern ages he doesn't include somewhere along the line". This release includes a large sampling of those composers and their songs. Friedwald writes, "He has been clever enough to find the great lyricists of the jazz song genre — Jazz Standards has three Lambert, Hendricks & Ross classics in a row ("Charleston Alley," "Farmer's Market," and "Bijou"), and he's also sung Abbey Lincoln's "Living Room". He's sung what few vocalese standards there are as well...". This release also includes two of Murphy's own vocalese with his lyrics to jazz instrumental improvisations on Wayne Shorter's "Effendi" and Lee Morgan's "Ceora". He added his own lyrics to John Coltrane's "Naima". One Murphy original song is included, "Come and Get Me".

Professional ratings
Review scores
Source	Rating
AllMusic	4/5 stars

== Reception ==
Michael G. Nastos assigns 4 stars to the album at AllMusic. He said, "It's a good overview of his middle career, he's in fine voice, and the backup players are first-rate. There's only one of his originals, but many of his inventive lyrics to standards are here, along with other modern jazz pieces [...] there's plenty in this two-CD, 26-track collection to show how Murphy had matured, and how fertile his mind was. Recommended, if you can find it". He singles out the jazz compositions "Effendi", "Ceora", "Bijou", "Doxy", and "Ask Me Now".

Scott Yanow says Jazz Standards is "excellent" in his book The Jazz Singers: The Ultimate Guide.

Assessing Murphy's recorded legacy from Muse Records in his book A Biographical Guide to the Great Jazz and Pop Singers, Will Friedwald points out the four Muse anthologies issued by Joel Dorn show "the astonishing range and scope, not to mention sheer size, of the singer's seventies and eighties output". Friedwald goes on to say the releases reveal, "his output has been so consistently excellent—that so many of these records deserve to be regarded, in retrospect, as classics of the jazz vocal genre—and that even his occasional missteps are instructive".

Friedwald describes Murphy's voice as a high baritone in his twenties which developed "into a deeper, gray, wood-toned timbre" by his forties with a wide vocal range extending from a deep base to a high falsetto. He likened his tone to a less nasal Jack Teagarden, quite distinct from all of the other male Great American Songbook singers.

== Track listing ==
Disc one
No.	Title	Lyrics	Music	Album	Length
1.	"Come and Get Me"	Mark Murphy	Murphy	Bridging a Gap	3:37
2.	"Gee, Baby, Ain't I Good to You"	Andy Razaf	Don Redman	Bridging a Gap	3:01
3.	"Maiden Voyage"	Jean Hancock	Herbie Hancock	Mark Murphy Sings	5:26
4.	"Sly"	Hancock	Hancock	Stolen Moments	4:12
5.	"Effendi"	Murphy	Wayne Shorter	Beauty and the Beast	4:41
6.	"Naima"	Murphy	John Coltrane	Mark Murphy Sings	4:49
7.	"Waltz for Debby"	Gene Lees	Bill Evans	Satisfaction Guaranteed	3:38
8.	"Trilogy for Kids: Babe's Blues / Little Niles / Dat Dere"	Hendricks / Weston / Oscar Brown Jr.	Randy Weston / Weston / Bobby Timmons	The Artistry of Mark Murphy	4:59
9.	"Ceora Lives"	Murphy	Lee Morgan	What a Way to Go	4:07
10.	"Saxophone Joe"	H. Smith	H. Smith	What a Way to Go	3:31
11.	"Doxy"	Sonny Rollins	Rollins	Beauty and the Beast	6:44
12.	"If You Could See Me Now"	Carl Sigman	Tadd Dameron	Kerouac, Then and Now	6:45
13.	"Lush Life"	Billy Strayhorn	Stayhorn	Mark Murphy Sings the Nat "King" Cole Songbook, Volume One	4:22

Disc two
No.	Title	Lyrics	Music	Album	Length
1.	"The Lady Who Sang the Blues"	Edwin Duff	Duff	Beauty and the Beast	5:29
2.	"Memphis Blues"	George A. Norton	W. C. Handy	Beauty and the Beast	6:10
3.	"Charleston Alley"	Leroy Kirkland, Robert Bruce	Kirkland, Bruce		2:39
4.	"Farmer’s Market"	Annie Ross	Art Farmer	Stolen Moments	2:51
5.	"Bijou"	Jon Hendricks	Ralph Burns	Satisfaction Guaranteed	3:30
6.	"Misty / Midnight Sun"	Johnny Burke / Johnny Mercer	Erroll Garner / Mercer, Sonny Burke	Living Room	5:56
7.	"Living Room"	Abbey Lincoln, Max Roach	Lincoln, Roach	Living Room	5:30
8.	"Along Came Betty"		Benny Golson	Beauty and the Beast	4:45
9.	"I Remember Clifford"	Hendricks	Golson	The Artistry of Mark Murphy	3:37
10.	"Goodbye Porkpie Hat"	Joni Mitchell	Charles Mingus	Bop for Kerouac	4:48
11.	"Ask Me Now"	Ben Sidran	Thelonious Monk	Kerouac, Then and Now	3:37
12.	"The Bird: Tribute (Quasimodo) / Embraceable You"	Sheila Jordan / Ira Gershwin	Charlie Parker / George Gershwin	One for Junior	7:05
13.	"Ain't Nobody Here but Us Chickens"	Alex Kramer, Joan Whitney	Kramer, Whitney	Living Room	5:22
Total length:					2:01:11

== Personnel ==
Production

- Michael Bourne – compilation producer, liner notes
- Gene Paul – mastering
- Page Simon – graphic design
- Nancy Dwyer – graphic design, illustrations
- Amy DiDonato – production coordinator
- Joel Dorn – series producer
- William Claxton – photography
