= Jimmy Madison (musician) =

American jazz drummer (1947–2026)

- Born: February 17, 1947; Cincinnati, Ohio, US
- Died: October 29, 2026 (aged 79)
- Genres: Jazz, Fusion, Bebop
- Instrument: Drums
- Years active: 1959–2026

James Henry Madison (born February 17, 1947, Cincinnati) is an American jazz drummer with a career spanning over six decades. He started playing the drums professionally at age 10 and was considered a child prodigy.

== Early life ==
Madison grew up in a musical family and was playing drums in public by age 12. In 1966, he worked in Ohio with Don Goldie, then toured with Lionel Hampton. He worked both in Cincinnati and New York in the late 1960s; by 1969, he had joined Marian McPartland in New York, working with her until 1972. He also worked as a record producer for his own studio.

As a leader, Madison led a small ensemble starting in the 1970s; his sidemen rotated over time but at times included Tom Harrell, Harold Danko, Phil Markowitz, Larry Schneider, Andy LaVerne, Dan Wall, Mike Richmond, Bill Evans, Kenny Barron, Dennis Irwin, Gene Perla, Manhattan Jazz Quintet, and Jon Burr.

He also led a big band in the early 1980s in New York. His associations as a sideman in the 1980s included Ron McClure, Janet Lawson, Chip Jackson, Ricky Ford, Jack Walrath, David Schnitter, Paul Nash, and Stanley Turrentine.

== Discography ==
Jimmy Madison (& Friends)

- Bumps On A Smooth Surface (Adelphi Records, 1978)
- Full Cycle (GNP Crescendo, 1983)
- 90° With 100% Humidity (Blue Chip Jazz, 1996)
- Sketch (Sunnyside Records, 2004)
- The Watcher (Landmark, 2007)

With Nina Simone

- Baltimore (CTI, 1978)

With Joe Farrell

- Upon This Rock (CTI Records, 1974)
- Canned Funk (CTI Records, 1975)

With Carmen McRae

- Ms. Jazz (Groove Merchant, 1974)

With Mark Murphy

- Bridging a Gap (Muse, 1972)
- Mark II (Muse, 1974)
- Mark Murphy Sings (Muse, 1975)
- Satisfaction Guaranteed (Muse, 1980)
- The Artistry of Mark Murphy (Muse, 1982)

With Jack Walrath

- In Europe (SteepleChase, 1982)
- Wholly Trinity (Muse, 1988)

With Lee Konitz

- Chicago ’n All That Jazz (Groove Merchant, 1975)

With Art Farmer

- Something You Got (CTI, 1977)

With Eddie Gómez

- Rain Forest (1979)
- Lend Me Your Ears (1979)

With James Brown

- Sho Is Funky Down Here (King Records, 1971)
- Hell (Polydor Records, 1974)

With Red Rodney aka 'Albino Red'

- Red Alert! (Muse, 1989)
- Then and Now (Chesky, 1992)

With Urbie Green

- Señor Blues (CTI, 1977)

With Yusef Lateef

- Autophysiopsychic (CTI, 1977)

With Stanley Turrentine

- Straight ahead (With George Benson)

Other collaborations

- Lionel Hampton
- Rahsaan Roland Kirk
- Stan Getz
- George Benson
- Steve Gilmore
- Tarik Share
- Dave Matthews
- Ricky Ford
- Chip Jackson
- Janet Lawson
- Ron McClure
- Quincy Jones
- Hubert Laws
- Harold Danko
- Jack Walrath
- Bobby Hackett
- Gene Perla
- Chet Baker
- Don Sebesky
- Paul Nash
- Michael Legrand
- Anita O'Day
- Hod O'Brien
- William Ash
- Joe Farrell
- David Schnitter
- Chris Potter
- Maceo Parker
- Lionel Hampton
- Duke Ellington Orchestra
- The Joffrey Ballet Orchestra
