= Mark Murphy Sings Mostly Dorothy Fields & Cy Coleman =

- Cover design by Reg Stagmaier

Studio album by Mark Murphy
- Released: 1978
- Recorded: September 1977
- Studio: Dick Phipps' Music Room, Lake Murray, Lexington, South Carolina
- Genre: Vocal jazz
- Length: 1:14:06
- Label: Audiophile Records
- Producer: Dick Phipps

Mark Murphy chronology
Mark Murphy Sings (1975)	Mark Murphy Sings Mostly Dorothy Fields & Cy Coleman (1978)	Stolen Moments (1978)

Mark Murphy Sings Mostly Dorothy Fields & Cy Coleman is a 1977 studio album by Mark Murphy.

Mark Murphy Sings Mostly Dorothy Fields & Cy Coleman is the 15th album by American jazz vocalist Mark Murphy. It was recorded when Murphy was 45 years old and released by the Audiophile Records label in the United States in 1978 on LP and 1998 on CD. This album is a release of songs and commentary from two episodes of the radio show American Popular Song with Alec Wilder and Friends.

== Background ==
Composer Alec Wilder wrote American Popular Song: The Great Innovators, 1900–1950. Published in 1972, it soon came to be considered a seminal reference on The Great American Songbook. Producer Dick Phipps subsequently developed the idea of a radio show with famous guest singers performing and discussing selected songs with Wilder and pianist Loonis McGlohon for the South Carolina Educational Radio Network. NPR aired the radio show American Popular Song with Alec Wilder and Friends, based on Wilder's book, from 1976 through 1978. The series of 38 one-hour radio programs featured guest singers Mabel Mercer, Bobby Short, Tony Bennett, Johnny Hartman, Mildred Bailey, Thelma Carpenter, Irene Kral, Jackie Cain, Teddi King, David Allyn, Barbara Lea, Marlene VerPlanck, Dick Haymes, Margaret Whiting, and others singing and discussing American popular song with pianist Loonis McGlohon and Wilder, who provided expert commentary. It won a 1976 Peabody Award for the South Carolina Educational Radio Network. Wilder had become a big Murphy supporter and had Murphy on his radio show. They recorded material for two shows in September 1977 and first broadcast in February 1978, featuring songs by Cy Coleman and Dorothy Fields. The recordings were released on LP in 1978 as Mark Murphy Sings Mostly Dorothy Fields & Cy Coleman (Audiophile). The CD reissue contained previously unreleased tracks.

In the original liner notes, Wilder recounts how he had been totally unaware of Murphy until McGlohon played him one of Murphy's recordings. At the time, after taping twenty-seven shows, Wilder found the program to be a burden and he wanted to stop his radio series. But hearing Murphy inspired him to continue. Shortly thereafter he decided to have Murphy as a guest on his show. Wilder said to McGlohon, "We have to get him before the public. We'll do another radio show". Wilder then agreed to do another 13 shows starting with Murphy singing Cy Coleman songs. Wilder wrote, "| was quite literally amazed. Mark’s musicianship, range, intonation, diction, inventiveness, and incredible rhythmic sense are all of a piece and all marvelous...| honestly consider him one of the very few great singers | have ever heard...Mark Murphy exemplifies professionalism, quality, distinction, and style". "Thenceforth," according to Fred Bouchard in the liner notes to Murphy's Satisfaction Guaranteed, "Wilder raved about Murphy as one of the greatest interpreters of ballads and standards (so reports WBUR-FM host and Murphy enthusiast Tony Cennamo)". And Murphy said of Wilder, "I run into people every few years, thank God, that are just instant friends, and it was like that with Alec. So many people don't relax me, but with him the talk flowed so freely, and | was just able to be myself".

== Recording ==
To convince Wilder to commit to the show and keep him at ease, the recordings were made in producer Dick Phipps' living room in Lake Murray, Lexington, South Carolina. Dick Phipps produced many additional Audiophile Records releases from the American Popular Song with Alec Wilder and Friends radio show as well as The Jazz Alliance label releases from Marian McPartland's NPR radio show Marian McPartland's Piano Jazz.

Pianist Loonis McGlohon was an accompanist to many singers including Johnny Hartman, Eileen Farrell, Mabel Mercer and Judy Garland and he wrote songs with Wilder including "Blackberry Winter" and "Be a Child", and on this release "Walking Sad", and "When Yesterday I Loved You". On this release McGlohon functions as music director, arranger and pianist with Terry Lassiter on bass, and Jim Lackey on drums. The Coleman selections include songs from Coleman's musicals Seesaw, Spanglish, and Sweet Charity, as well as other songs he wrote in the 50s, 60s and 70s. The Fields' selections include songs she wrote with Coleman, Jerome Kern, Jimmy McHugh, and Arthur Schwartz, spanning her long career from the 30s–70s. In addition, Murphy sings two Alec Wilder and Loonis McGlohon songs and "Doodlin" from Murphy's own album Rah.

== Reception ==
Professional ratings
Review scores
Source	Rating
The Rolling Stone Jazz Record Guide	4/5 stars
The Virgin Encyclopedia of Popular Music	3/5 stars
The Penguin Guide to Jazz Recordings	3/4 stars

Andy Rowan assigns this album 4 stars in The Rolling Stone Jazz Record Guide. (4 stars means, "Excellent: Four-star albums represent peak performances in an artist's career. Generally speaking, albums that are granted four or more stars constitute the best introductions to an artist's work for listeners who are curious").

Colin Larkin assigns 3 stars to the album in The Virgin Encyclopedia of Popular Music. (3 stars means, "Good: a record of average worth, but one that might possess considerable appeal for fans of a particular style").

The Penguin Guide to Jazz Recordings assigns the album 3 stars. (3 stars means," A good, middleweight set; one that lacks the stature or consistency of the finest records, but which will reward the listener tuned to its merits").

Peter Reilly writing in Stereo Review in 1979, singles out "I'm Gonna Laugh You Right Out of My Life", "I Walk a Little Faster" as two Coleman "gems" and says Murphy gives "dapper, worldly readings" of Fields' "Don't Blame Me", "I'm in the Mood for Love", and "A Fine Romance". He writes, "Murphy use his voice almost as a musical instrument in the best old-jazz style, yet along with it he maintains an almost uncanny ability to shed new and different light on lyric meanings".

Scott Yanow includes the album in his list of other worthy recordings by Mark Murphy of the past 20 years in his book The Jazz Singers: The Ultimate Guide.

Murphy biographer Peter Jones finds this album "a surprise, and a delightful one...the album reveals Murphy as a peerless straight-ahead interpreter of standards"...giving "low-key, warm and intimate" readings.

== Track listing ==
1. "Don't Blame Me" (Jimmy McHugh, Dorothy Fields) – 2:52
  - Chicago Revue: Clowns in Clover 1933
2. "Witchcraft" (Cy Coleman, Carolyn Leigh) – 2:36
  - Revue: Julius Monk’s Take Five 1957
3. "A Fine Romance" (Jerome Kern, Fields) – 2:16
  - Film: Swing Time 1936
4. "April Fooled Me" (Kern, Fields) – 2:12
5. "Seesaw" (Coleman, Fields) – 3:04
  - Musical: “Seesaw" 1973
6. "I'm Gonna Laugh You Right Out of My Life" (Coleman, Joseph Allen McCarthy) – 3:14
7. "When In Rome" (Coleman, Leigh) – 2:47
8. "When Yesterday I Loved You" (Alec Wilder, Loonis McGlohon) – 3:47
9. "Where Am I Going" (Coleman, Fields) – 2:53
  - Musical: Sweet Charity 1966
10. "Walking Sad" (Wilder, McGlohon) – 3:57
11. "Exactly Like You" (McHugh, Fields) – 1:57
  - Revue: Lew Leslie’s International Review 1930
12. "Alone Too Long" (Arthur Schwartz, Fields) – 3:20
  - Musical: By the Beautiful Sea 1954
13. "On Second Thought" (Coleman, Leigh) – 2:51
14. "I Walk a Little Faster" (Coleman, Leigh) – 2:12
15. "Rules of the Road"(Coleman, Leigh) – 3:21
16. "That's My Style" (Coleman, Peggy Lee) – 3:16
17. "I'm in the Mood for Love" (McHugh, Fields) – 3:17
  - Film: Every Night at Eight 1935
18. "The Best Is Yet to Come" (Coleman, Leigh) – 2:15
19. "Real Live Girl" (Coleman, Leigh) – 1:60
  - Commentary by Mark Murphy, Wilder and McGlohon
20. "Remind Me" (Kern, Fields) – 3:42
  - Film: One Night in the Tropics 1940
21. "I Love My Wife" (Coleman, Michael Stewart) – 3:34
  - Musical: I Love My Wife 1977
22. "Sometime When You're Lonely" (Coleman) – 2:57
  - Musical: Spanglish 1965
23. "Doodlin' " (Horace Silver, Jon Hendricks) – 3:58
24. "I'm Way Ahead" (Coleman, Fields) – 4:14
  - Musical: Seesaw 1973
25. "Lovely To Look At" (Kern, Fields, McHugh) – 1:34
  - Film: Roberta 1935
  - Commentary by Wilder

== Personnel ==
Performance

- Mark Murphy – vocals
- Terry Lassiter – bass
- Jim Lackey – drums
- Loonis McGlohon – piano, arranger

Production

- William D, Hay – mastering, engineer,
- Dick Phipps – producer
- Parker Dinkins – digital transfers, premastering
- Wendell Echols – production coordinator
- Reg Stagmaier – art direction, cover design
- Alec Wilder – liner notes, 1978
- James Gavin – liner notes, 1998
- George H Buck, Jr. – liner notes
