= Señor Blues =

Señor Blues may refer to:

- "Señor Blues" (song), a composition by Horace Silver
- Señor Blues (Taj Mahal album)
- Señor Blues (Urbie Green album)
