= David Matthews (keyboardist) =

American keyboardist and arranger

- Born: David Richard Matthews; March 4, 1942 (age 84); Sonora, Kentucky, U.S.
- Genres: Jazz, jazz fusion, jazz-funk
- Occupations: Instrumentalist, arranger
- Instruments: Keyboards; piano
- Years active: 1966–present
- Labels: CTI, Electric Bird
- Website: davidmatthewsjazz.com
- Education: University of Cincinnati

David Matthews (born March 4, 1942) is an American keyboardist, pianist, and music arranger.

== Early life and education ==
Matthews was born David Richard Matthews in Sonora, Kentucky. He was born with "a birth defect, and my entire right side didn’t develop as much as a normal human body." He was able to play chords with his right hand's fused fingers, by moving his hand the way a vibraphonist holding four mallets fixed between his fingers moves his hand to play different chords. He earned a bachelor's degree in composition from the University of Cincinnati.

== Career ==
Matthews has composed television soundtracks as well as albums with the Manhattan Jazz Orchestra. He is the leader of the Manhattan Jazz Quintet. Matthews was also the leader of the musical group The Grodeck Whipperjenny, a psychedelic funkband in the seventies.

In 1970, he began working as both an arranger and bandleader for James Brown. Matthews has worked with various musicians, including Bonnie Raitt, Buddy Rich, Idris Muhammad, and the Starland Vocal Band. He was staff arranger for Creed Taylor's CTI Records label during the mid-1970s, working on albums for artists such as George Benson, Esther Phillips, Grover Washington Jr., Hank Crawford, and Idris Muhammad.

In 1977, he became one of the first artists to dedicate an entire composition to Frank Herbert's Dune, publishing an album that went by the same name.

In 1978, Matthews arranged strings and orchestra and played piano on Nina Simone's album Baltimore.

Matthews music has been heavily sampled by many hip-hop artists such as The Notorious B.I.G., Nas, MF Doom, Method Man, Redman and Large Professor and others.

== Discography ==
=== As leader ===
- The Grodeck Whipperjenny, People – rec. 1970
- Big Band Recorded at the Five Spot (Muse, 1975)
- Shoogie Wanna Boogie with Whirlwind (Kudu, 1976)
- Dune (CTI, 1977)
- Digital Love (Electric Bird, 1979)
- Cosmic City with the Electric Birds (King, 1980)
- Grand Cross (Bellaphon, 1983)
- Delta Lady (Electric Bird, 1983)
- Super Funky Sax (Electric Bird, 1984)
- Billy Boy (King/Paddle Wheel, 1986)
- Waltz for Debby (Paddle Wheel, 1987)
- Speed Demon with the First Calls (Electric Bird, 1989)
- Tennessee Waltz (Paddle Wheel, 1989)
- Jazz Ballads with Strings (Sweet Basil, 1991)
- Watermelon Man with the Super Latin Jazz Orchestra (Sweet Basil, 1997)
- Furuhata Jazz in N.Y. (WEA, 1997)
- Mambo No. 5 (Sweet Basil, 1998)
- Back to Bach (Milestone, 2000)
- The Girl from Ipanema with N.Y. Friends (Videoarts Music, 2002) – rec. 2001
- Impressions with N.Y. Friends (Videoarts Music, 2002) – rec. 2001
- Hey Duke! with the Manhattan Jazz Orchestra (Milestone, 2002) – rec. 1999

=== Appears on ===
- James Brown, Sho' Is Funky Down Here, (King, 1971)
- James Brown, "I Cried/World Pt. 2", (Starday King, 1971)[7"]
- Vicki Anderson, "I'll Work It Out/In the Land of Milk and Honey", (Brownstone, 1971)[7"]
- James Brown, "I Got a Bag of My Own", (Polydor, 1972)[7"]
- Lyn Collins, Think (About It), (People, 1972)
- James Brown, "Sexy, Sexy, Sexy", (Polydor, 1973)[7"]

=== Production ===
With Patti Austin

- End of a Rainbow (CTI, 1976) - Arranger

With George Benson

- In Concert-Carnegie Hall (CTI, 1975) - Arranger
- Good King Bad (CTI, 1975) - Arranger
- Benson & Farrell with Joe Farrell (CTI, 1976) - Arranger

With Ron Carter

- Anything Goes (Kudu, 1975) - Arranger

With Hank Crawford

- I Hear a Symphony (Kudu, 1975) - Composer and Arranger
- Hank Crawford's Back (Kudu, 1976) - Composer and Arranger

With Art Farmer

- Something You Got (CTI, 1977) - Arranger & Piano
- Big Blues with Jim Hall (CTI, 1978) - Arranger

With Grant Green

- The Main Attraction (Kudu, 1976) - Arranger

With Urbie Green

- The Fox (CTI, 1976) - Arranger
- Señor Blues (CTI, 1977) - Arranger & Piano

With Jim Hall

- Concierto de Aranjuez (Evidence, 1981) - Composer, Arranger, Electric Piano

With Yusef Lateef

- Autophysiopsychic (CTI, 1977) - Arranger

With O'Donel Levy

- Everything I Do Gonna Be Funky (Groove Merchant, 1974) - Arranger

With Blue Mitchell

- Many Shades of Blue (Mainstream, 1974) - Composer, Arranger and Conductor

With Idris Muhammad

- House Of The Rising Sun (Kudu, 1975)
- Turn This Mutha Out (Kudu, 1977)
- Boogie to the Top (Kudu, 1978)

With Mark Murphy

- Bridging a Gap (Muse, 1973)
- Mark II (Muse, 1974)
- Mark Murphy Sings (Muse, 1975)
- The Artistry of Mark Murphy (Muse, 1982)

With Nina Simone

- Baltimore (CTI, 1978) - Arranger & Piano

With Super Trombone (Dave Bargeron, David Taylor, James E. Pugh and Ray Anderson)

- Super Trombone (Sweet Basil, 1995)

With Jeremy Steig

- Firefly (CTI, 1977) - Arranger & Piano
