= Mark Murphy Sings Nat King Cole & More =

Compilation album by Mark Murphy
- Released: 1999
- Recorded: 1972–1991
- Genre: Vocal jazz
- Label: 32 Jazz
- Producer: Michael Bourne

Mark Murphy chronology
| Crazy Rhythm: Debut Recordings (1999) | Mark Murphy Sings Nat King Cole & More (1999) | Meet Mark Murphy (2000) |

Mark Murphy Sings Nat King Cole & More is a compilation album of American jazz vocalist Mark Murphy's Muse Records recordings. It was released by the 32 Jazz label in the United States in 1999. This album is a collection of songs from his Muse years 1972–1991.

== Background ==
Muse Records was founded by Joe Fields in 1972. Fields sold the label in 1996 to Joel Dorn who released four compilation albums from Mark Murphy's Muse catalogue on the 32 Jazz label, Stolen...And Other Moments, Jazz Standards, Songbook, and Mark Murphy Sings Nat King Cole & More. Writer and broadcaster Michael Bourne was enlisted to put together the four collections.

This collection contains all most all of Mark Murphy Sings the Nat King Cole Songbook, Volume One. Two of Murphy's Nat King Cole tribute songs were left out of the original CD release Mark Murphy Sings Nat's Choice The Complete Nat "King" Cole Songbook Volumes 1 and 2, but are covered on these 32 Jazz collections. Murphy's medley of "Until The Real Thing Comes Along" / "Baby, Baby, All The Time" was included on Stolen...And Other Moments. This release includes "Walkin' My Baby Back Home" / "Breezin' Along with the Breeze".

== Reception ==
Professional ratings
Review scores
| Source | Rating |
|---|---|
| AllMusic | 4/5 stars |

AllMusic assigned 4 stars to the album. Its review by Thom Jurek says, "Murphy is one of the great jazz singers of the 20th century. He brought a beat generation sense of cool and experimentation to standards without ever losing the nuances and carefully collected vocal skills that come from the jazz tradition...he offers new — and sometimes radical — interpretations of the music associated with Cole". Jurek goes on to write that Murphy's liberties, "look through tradition and outside it for expression, and in his gorgeous, somewhat grainy baritone, he does the material justice far more often than he simply misses the mark, and pulls to the breaking point of a song's own margins".

Scott Yanow says this release is "excellent" in his book The Jazz Singers: The Ultimate Guide.

Assessing Murphy's recorded legacy from Muse Records in his book A Biographical Guide to the Great Jazz and Pop Singers, Will Friedwald points out the four Muse anthologies issued by Joel Dorn show "the astonishing range and scope, not to mention sheer size, of the singer's seventies and eighties output". Friedwald goes on to say the releases reveal, "his output has been so consistently excellent—that so many of these records deserve to be regarded, in retrospect, as classics of the jazz vocal genre—and that even his occasional missteps are instructive".

== Track listing ==
Disc one

1. "Nature Boy / Calypso Blues" (Eden Ahbez / Nat King Cole, Don George) – 5:56
2. "Love Letters / Serenata" (Victor Young, Edward Heyman / Leroy Anderson, Mitchell Parish) – 3:39
3. "Oh You Crazy Moon" (Jimmy Van Heusen, Johnny Burke) – 3:38
4. "’Tis Autumn" (Henry Nemo) – 4:13
5. "I Keep Goin' Back to Joe's" (Marvin Fisher, Jack Segal) – 4:18
6. "Tangerine" (Victor Schertzinger, Johnny Mercer) – 3:50
7. "Never Let Me Go" (Jay Livingston, Ray Evans) – 3:32
8. "These Foolish Things" (Jack Strachey, Harry Link, Holt Marvell) – 4:17
9. "Don't Let Your Eyes Go Shopping" (Billy Austin, Sheldon Smith) – 4:12
10. "More Than You Know" (Vincent Youmans, Edward Eliscu, Billy Rose) – 3:40
11. "Maybe You'll Be There" (Rube Bloom, Sammy Gallop) – 4:41
12. "Portrait of Jennie / Ruby" (J. Russel Robinson, Gordon Burdge / Heinz Roemheld, Mitchell Parish) – 5:01
13. "Blue Gardenia" (Lester Lee, Bob Russell) – 3:04
14. "Look Out for Love" (Danny Meehan, Colin Romoff) – 2:15
15. "For All We Know" (J. Fred Coots, Sam M. Lewis) – 3:32
16. "The End of a Love Affair" (Billy Sherrill) – 3:27
17. "Walkin' My Baby Back Home / Breezin' Along With the Breeze" (Fred Ahlert, Roy Turk / Haven Gillespie, Seymour Simons, Richard A. Whiting) – 3:49
18. "Eastern Ballad" (George Gruntz, Allen Ginsberg) – 7:14

Disc two

1. "Spring Friend" (Bill Mays, Mark Murphy) – 5:18
2. "They" (Murphy) – 3:37
3. "Trust in Me" (Milton Ager, Jean Schwartz, Ned Wever) – 6:34
4. "Round About / It All Goes Round" (Vernon Duke, Ogden Nash / David Foster) – 6:26
5. "Small World" (Reuben Brown) – 3:09
6. "Sunday in New York" (Peter Nero, Carroll Coates) – 5:08
7. "Sausalito" (Murphy) – 3:42
8. "Barangrill" (Joni Mitchell) – 3:38
9. "Chicken Road" (Joe Greene) – 5:46
10. "Jamaica (A Little Island of Calm)" (Randy Goodrum) – 5:57
11. "Maxine" (Donald Fagen) – 2:35
12. "L.A. Song Cycle": "L.A." / "L.A. Breakdown" / "The Way It Was In L.A." (Med Flory / Larry Marks / Ray Linn)– 5:55
13. "D.C. Farewell" (Richie Cole) – 2:59
14. "Welcome Home" (Judy Holliday, Alec Wilder) – 5:22
15. "I Return To Music" (Kirby Shaw, Gayle Landess) – 5:19

== Personnel ==
Production

- Michael Bourne – compilation producer, liner notes
- Gene Paul – mastering
- Page Simon – graphic design
- Nancy Dwyer – graphic design, digital illustration
- Becky Wisdom – production coordinator
- Joel Dorn – series producer
