= Sho Is Funky Down Here =

Studio album by James Brown
- Released: April 1971
- Recorded: February 24, 1970; February 27, 1970
- Studios: King Studios (Cincinnati, Ohio)
- Genres: Instrumental rock; Psychedelic funk
- Length: 30:00
- Labels: King; 1110
- Producer: James Brown

James Brown chronology
Super Bad (1971)	Sho Is Funky Down Here (1971)	Hot Pants (1971)

Sho Is Funky Down Here is the 31st studio album by American musician James Brown, released in 1971 on King Records, his last album on the label after having been on the label since 1956.

== Overview ==
An entirely instrumental album, it's full of heavy fuzzed-out guitars in a jazzy psychedelic rock style, resembling the first records by Funkadelic. All songs are by James Brown and David Matthews and the record is somewhat a second album by Matthews' Grodeck Whipperjenny group. David Matthews worked as the band leader for James Brown at the time.

== Chart performance ==
Sho Is Funky Down Here peaked at No. 26 on the Billboard Best Selling Soul LP's chart and No. 137 on the Top LP's chart in May 1971. The album reached No. 122 on Cashbox magazine's Top 100 Albums chart a three-week run on it.

== Critical reception ==
Professional ratings
Review scores
Source	Rating
AllMusic	1.5/5 stars
The Rolling Stone Album Guide	2/5 stars

Kurt Edwards reviewed the album for AllMusic, writing, "Even within that narrow subsection, Sho Is Funky Down Here stands out: an almost completely unsoulful album — at least as close as James Brown will ever come, even in his later years — full of fuzzed-out guitars, poorly recorded drums, and not much else."

== Track listing ==
All tracks composed by James Brown and David Matthews

Side A
No.	Title	Length
1.	"Sho Is Funky Down Here"	8:36
2.	"Don’t Mind"	3:31
3.	"Bob Scoward"	3:21
Total length:		15:36

Side B
No.	Title	Length
4.	"Just Enough Room For Storage"	5:58
5.	"You Mother You"	3:32
6.	"Can Mind"	4:52
Total length:		14:24

== Personnel ==
- James Brown – harpsichord, organ, vocals
- David Matthews – organ, piano
- Kenny Poole – guitar
- Michael Moore – bass
- Jimmy Madison – drums

== Charts ==
Chart peaks for Sho Is Funky Down Here
Chart (1971)	Peak position
US Billboard Top LP's	137
US Billboard Best Selling Soul LP's	26
US Cashbox Top 100 Albums	122
