= Mark II (Mark Murphy album) =

1973 studio album by Mark Murphy

Studio album by Mark Murphy
- Released: 1974
- Recorded: 1973
- Studio: Basement Studios
- Genre: Vocal jazz
- Length: 38:27
- Label: Muse
- Producer: Helen Keane, David Matthews

Mark Murphy chronology
Bridging a Gap (1972)	Mark II (1974)	Mark Murphy Sings (1975)

Mark II is a 1973 studio album by Mark Murphy.

Mark II is the 13th studio album by American jazz vocalist Mark Murphy. It was recorded in 1973 when Murphy was 41 years old and released by the Muse label in the United States in 1974. The album is a collection of then contemporary rock tunes backed by a jazz sextet. Songs by Stevie Wonder, Joni Mitchell, The Band, Jefferson Airplane and Bread are included. Murphy contributes two original tunes.

== Background ==
This album was a follow up to his first Muse album Bridging a Gap. "This time the idea was not so much to bridge a gap between rock and jazz, but to make a slightly jazz-influenced rock album". Peter Jones, Murphy's biographer, calls the album "an obvious attempt to reach the rock generation". He also finds a "strong country influence", suggesting Murphy was "floundering". Jones writes, "Many singing stars of the Fifties had experienced similar helplessness in the face of pop and rock's continuing onslought".

== Recording ==
Producer Dave Matthews was also the arranger for this release. He worked with Murphy on four Muse Records records including Mark II, Bridging a Gap, The Artistry of Mark Murphy and Mark Murphy Sings. Producer Helen Keane also worked with Murphy on Bridging a Gap and Mark Murphy Sings.

Jimmy Madison on drums worked with Murphy on Muse releases Bridging A Gap, Mark Murphy Sings and Satisfaction Guaranteed. The album feature two guitarists, John Tropea, who recorded with Eumir Deodato, and Sam Brown, who worked with Gary Burton and Keith Jarrett, and who also appeared on Bridging a Gap. Bassist Michael Moore and pianist Kenny Ascher make their only studio appearance with Murphy. Percussionist Sue Evans also worked with Murphy on the Muse releases The Artistry Of Mark Murphy and Mark Murphy Sings.

"Lookin' For Another Pure Love" is from Stevie Wonder's Talking Book. "Barangrill" is from Joni Mitchell's For the Roses. "Triad" is by David Crosby and was first recorded by Jefferson Airplane on Crown of Creation. Bread's "Too Much Love" and "Truckin' " are from Manna, both written by James Griffin and Robb Royer. The Band's "The Unfaithful Servant" by Robbie Robertson is from their albumThe Band and "Sleeping" by Richard Manuel and Robertson is from Stage Fright. "Chicken Road" had been previously recorded by Tennessee Earnie Ford. Murphy contributes two original songs, "They" and "Lemme Blues".

Professional ratings
Review scores
Source	Rating
AllMusic	3/5 stars
The Rolling Stone Jazz Record Guide	2/5 stars
The Virgin Encyclopedia of Popular Music	3/5 stars
DownBeat	1/5 stars

== Reception ==
AllMusic assigns the album 4 stars. Ron Wynn writes, "Strong, individualistic material featuring Murphy doing scat, interpretations, and reworkings of jazz and pre-rock pop tunes with his vivid delivery and dynamic manner".

The Rolling Stone Jazz Record Guide assigned the album 2 stars (meaning, "Mediocre: records that are artistically insubstantial, though not truly wretched").

Colin Larkin assigns 3 stars in The Virgin Encyclopedia of Popular Music. (Three stars means, "Good. By the artist's usual standards and therefore recommended".

DownBeat assigned the album 1 star (meaning, poor). Bill Adler wrote, "Vocalist Murphy has nothing to offer the readers of this magazine. Despite ludicrously overblown liner commentary claims to the contrary, he is little more than a “polite supper-club singer” who decided, this time, to record tunes by the likes of Joni Mitchell and Stevie Wonder instead of by Irving Berlin or Bacharach/David. His versions add nothing to the originals".

In his book A Biographical Guide to the Great Jazz and Pop Singers, Will Friedwald laments, "Much of his second Muse release, Mark II, is a waste". He calls having Murphy perform 70s pop/soft rock tunes over synthesizers a "misguided idea that he could sell more records" this way.

Murphy biography Peter Jones writes the album, "failed to ignite popular enthusiasm for Mark Murphy".

== Track listing ==
1. "Chicken Road" (Joe Greene) – 5:46
2. "Too Much Love" (James Griffin, Robb Royer) – 3:29
3. "The Unfaithful Servant" (Robbie Robertson) – 2:51
4. "Lookin' For Another Pure Love" (Stevie Wonder, Syreeta) – 2:51
5. "Barangrill" (Joni Mitchell) – 3:38
6. "Triad" (David Crosby) – 4:12
7. "They" (Mark Murphy) – 3:37
8. 'Sleeping" (Richard Manuel, Robbie Robertson) – 3:36
9. "Lemme Blues" (Murphy) – 5:40
10. "Truckin' " (Griffin, Royer) – 2:87

== Personnel ==
Performance

- Mark Murphy – vocals
- Sam Brown – guitar
- John Tropea – guitar
- Michael Moore – bass
- Kenny Ascher – keyboards, piano
- Jimmy Madison – drums
- Sue Evans – percussion
- David Matthews – arranger

Production

- Ray Hall – engineer, recorded at Basement Studios, 1973
- Helen Keane – producer
- David Matthews – producer
- Peter Keepnews – liner notes
