= The Artistry of Mark Murphy =

Studio album by Mark Murphy
- Released: 1982
- Recorded: 1982
- Studio: Sear Sound, NYC
- Genre: Vocal jazz
- Length: 35:05
- Label: Muse
- Producer: Dave Matthews

Mark Murphy chronology
Bop for Kerouac (1981)	The Artistry of Mark Murphy (1982)	Brazil Song (Cancões Do Brasil) (1983)

The Artistry of Mark Murphy is a 1982 studio album by Mark Murphy.

The Artistry of Mark Murphy is the 19th studio album by American jazz vocalist Mark Murphy. It was recorded in 1982 when Murphy was 50 years old and released by the Muse label in the United States in 1982. The album is a collection of jazz tunes and standards with Murphy backed by a septet. Murphy contributes original lyrics to George Wallington's "Godchild".

== Background ==
In between touring after recording Bop for Kerouac, and planning Brazil Song following a visit to Rio, Murphy recorded The Artistry of Mark Murphy.

In the liner notes by Rick Petrone, Murphy summarizes the singers who were his early influences saying, "I think when I was training years ago I really started out on Nat Cole and June Christy. Very soon after I memorized Ella Fitzgerald's "Lady Be Good" and then I went through a real heavy voice period of Sarah Vaughan and Billy Eckstine in my high school days. Then for years I didn't listen to anybody but Peggy Lee. From singing in jazz clubs, through constant improvisation, you just let out whatever comes and that is the essence of jazz singing."

Murphy goes on to describe his approach, saying, "I'm not really a stylist like the money makers. They stamp a song and then you know exactly how you're going to get it. I change mine every night. I guess I have a style, but I wouldn't call myself a hard-core stylist. I just say I'm a creative singer and my music is jazz. It becomes a style when it's not like something else."

== Recording ==
Producer Dave Matthews was also the arranger for this release and had previously worked with Murphy on three Muse Records records, Bridging A Gap, Mark II, and Mark Murphy Sings. This fourth collaboration would be the last.

The jazz septet backing Murphy includes Gene Bertoncini on guitar, with the two performing a duet on Benny Golson's "I Remember Clifford". The lyric is by Jon Hendricks. Bertoncini had previously worked with Murphy on Satisfaction Guaranteed. Jimmy Madison (from previous Muse releases Bridging A Gap, Mark II, Mark Murphy Sings and Satisfaction Guaranteed) was back on drums. Tom Harrell, who also performed with Murphy on Satisfaction Guaranteed and would later appear on The Latin Porter, is on trumpet and flugelhorn. Gerry Niewood, who would later appear on Murphy's Living Room, is on saxophone. Mark Egan, also on Satisfaction Guaranteed, plays electric bass. Ben Aronov on piano and George Mraz on bass make their only studio appearances with Murphy. Sue Evans having previously recorded with Murphy on Mark Murphy Sings and Mark II, returns on percussion.

"The Odd Child" is George Wallington's instrumental tune "Godchild" with original lyrics written by Murphy. The melody first appeared on Miles Davis' The Birth of the Cool in 1950.

Professional ratings
Review scores
Source	Rating
AllMusic	4/5 stars
The Rolling Stone Jazz Record Guide	2/5 stars

== Reception ==
AllMusic assigns the album 4 stars. Scott Yanow writes, "Mark Murphy's string of Muse recordings contains most of his greatest work". He singles out "Trilogy for Kids", "The Odd Child", "Moody's Mood" and "Autumn Nocturne" as memorable performances.

The Rolling Stone Jazz Record Guide assigned the album 2 stars (meaning, "Mediocre: records that are artistically insubstantial, though not truly wretched").

In his book A Biographical Guide to the Great Jazz and Pop Singers, writing about the Jerome Kern and James Taylor "Long Ago and Far Away" medley, Will Friedwald said, "Murphy gives James Taylor some jazz credibility he might not otherwise have...As usual he is being provocative--he always has some kind of a point to make".

Murphy biography Peter Jones writes about the album, "It sustained the mellow, mature feel of Bop for Kerouac, but somehow the latter's excitement and creative tension were absent, with a feeling of treading water, and the vocal is often given too much reverb".

== Track listing ==
1. "The Odd Child" (George Wallington, Mark Murphy) – 2:58
2. "I Don't Want to Cry Anymore" (Victor Schertzinger) – 6:33
3. "Moody's Mood" (Jimmy McHugh, James Moody, Eddie Jefferson) – 3:45
4. "Triology for Kids: Babe's Blues / Little Niles / Dat Dere" (Randy Weston, Jon Hendricks / Weston / Bobby Timmons, Oscar Brown Jr.) – 5:11
5. "I Remember Clifford" (Benny Golson, Hendricks) – 3:37
6. "Autumn Nocturne" (Josef Myrow, Kim Gannon) – 3:49
7. "Close Enough for Love" (Johnny Mandel) – 5:05
8. "Long Ago and Far Away / Long Ago and Far Away" (Jerome Kern, Ira Gershwin / James Taylor) – 4:07

== Personnel ==
Performance

- Mark Murphy – vocals
- Gene Bertoncini – guitar
- George Mraz – bass (tracks 1, 3, 6, 7)
- Mark Egan – electric bass (tracks 2, 4, 8)
- Ben Aronov – piano
- Jimmy Madison – drums
- Gerry Niewood – saxophone
- Tom Harrell – trumpet, flugelhorn (tracks 3–8)
- Sue Evans – percussion
- Dave Matthews – arranger

Production

- Chuck Irwin – engineer, recorded at Sear Sound, NYC in 1982
- Dave Matthews – producer
- Joe Brescio – mastering
- Rick Petrone – liner notes
- W. Dale Cramer – art direction
- Hugh Bell – photography
