= The Fox (Urbie Green album) =

Studio album by Urbie Green
- Released: 1976
- Recorded: July, October and November 1976
- Studio: Van Gelder Studio, Englewood Cliffs, NJ
- Genre: Jazz
- Length: 36:11
- Label: CTI; CTI 7070
- Producer: Creed Taylor

Urbie Green chronology
Urbie Green's Big Beautiful Band (1974)	The Fox (1976)	Señor Blues (1977)

The Fox is an album by American trombonist Urbie Green featuring performances recorded in 1976 and released on the CTI label.

== Track listing ==
1. "Another Star" (Stevie Wonder) - 7:14
2. "Goodbye" (Gordon Jenkins) - 2:57
3. "Mertensia" (David Matthews) - 4:58
4. "You Don't Know What Love Is" (Gene de Paul, Don Raye) - 3:59
5. "Manteca" (Gil Fuller, Dizzy Gillespie, Chano Pozo) - 6:35
6. "Foxglove Suite" (Richard Wagner) - 7:27
7. "Please Send Me Someone to Love" (Percy Mayfield) - 5:31

- Recorded at Van Gelder Studio in Englewood Cliffs, New Jersey in July, October and November 1976

== Personnel ==
- Urbie Green - trombone
- Joe Farrell - flute, soprano saxophone
- Jeremy Steig - flute
- Fred Gripper - electric piano
- Barry Miles - piano, keyboards
- Mike Abene - piano
- Eric Gale - guitar
- Anthony Jackson - electric bass
- George Mraz - bass
- Jimmy Madison, Andy Newmark - drums
- Mike Mainieri - vibraphone
- Toots Thielmans - harmonica, whistle
- Sue Evans, Nicky Marrero - percussion
- David Matthews - arranger, footsteps
