= Janet Lawson =

American jazz singer (1940–2021)

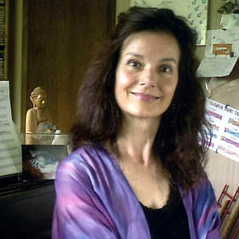

Background information
- Born: November 13, 1940; Baltimore, Maryland, U.S.
- Died: January 22, 2021 (aged 80) New Jersey
- Genre: Jazz
- Occupations: Singer, educator
- Years active: 1960–c.2010

Janet Lawson (November 13, 1940 – January 22, 2021) was a jazz singer and educator. Her primary influences as a singer were saxophonists such as Charlie Parker, Lester Young and Sonny Rollins. Her voice was described by jazz critic John S. Wilson in a 1977 New York Times article entitled Janet Lawson: The Dream Jazz Voice writing that she "has the kind of voice that most jazz singers probably wish they had. It is a full, well-developed, remarkably pliant voice with a lower range whose dark sonorities compare favorably with the deep power of Sarah Vaughan, and a high register in which she does not have to strain to project very fast, often complex, lines."

== Career ==
Lawson was born in Baltimore to a Jewish father and Catholic mother from Eastern Europe. Her father was a jazz drummer and her mother was a singer and lyricist who sometimes sang in her father's band. At home, they worked on songs together at the piano. She performed on the radio and regional television as a child. Lawson began singing with a local big band in her teens. When she was eighteen, she moved to New York City and got a job as a secretary at Columbia Records. Lawson appeared regularly on Steve Allen's television show (1968-1969) and worked in theater. She lived across the street from Al Jeter, the head of Riverside Records, and made contacts when she attended parties at his penthouse apartment. She went to jazz clubs and was inspired by seeing Thelonious Monk. She made her debut at the Village Vanguard with Art Farmer. In 1976, Lawson formed the Janet Lawson Quintet, which in 1983 included Roger Rosenberg, a saxophonist and flutist, Bill O'Connell, piano, Ratzo Harris, bass, and Jimmy Madison, drums. Lawson became known as a scat singer and improviser.

Lawson has worked with Art Farmer, Chick Corea, Ron Carter, Bob Dorough, Duke Ellington, Tommy Flanagan, Sheila Jordan, Barry Harris, Milt Hinton, Eddie Jefferson, Barney Kessel, Dave Liebman, Joe Newman, Rufus Reid, Clark Terry, Ed Thigpen, Cedar Walton, Duke Pearson and David Lahm.

She has taught voice at New York University and the New School, given private lessons, taught elementary school children, and has made trips every year to Latvia to attend a youth music camp.

In the early 2000s, she was diagnosed with Lyme disease and Bell's palsy, suffering damage to her vocal cords. Lawson also had Parkinson's disease.

She died on January 22, 2021.

== Awards and honors ==
- Grammy Award nomination, Best Jazz Vocal Performance, Female, 1982
- Hall of Fame nomination, International Association for Jazz Education, 2007

== Published Writings ==
- Blowing on the Changes: Reflections of a Jazz Woman (Heresies Magazine Issue #10: Women and Music (Volume 3, Number 2))

== Discography ==
- The Janet Lawson Quintet (Inner City, 1981)
- Dreams Can Be (Omnisound, 1984)

With Eddie Jefferson

- The Main Man (Inner City, 1977)
