= Chuck Metcalf =

American jazz double-bassist

- Born: January 8, 1931; Seattle, Washington, USA
- Died: January 11, 2012 (aged 81)
- Genres: Jazz
- Occupation(s): Musician, architect
- Instrument: Double bass

Chuck Metcalf (8 January 1931 − 11 January 2012) was an American jazz double-bassist. He taught at Garfield High School's Magnet Program with saxophonist Joe Brazil in 1968. In 1980 he toured with Dexter Gordon. His first solo studio album named Elsie Street was released in 1989. In January 2012 he died from cancer.

== Discography ==
=== As leader ===
- Live in Seattle (1987)
- Elsie Street (1989)
- Help Is Coming (1992)
- Thinking of You (2004)

With Bert Wilson

- Rebirth Loves Monk! (1987)
- Live at Caffe Star-Bucks (1987)
- Wings (1987)
- Live at the Bellevue Jazz Festival (1987)
- Live at the ZOO (1990)

With others

- Joni Metcalf: Sings Porter and Ellington (1965)
- Overton Berry: Live at the Double-Tree (1970)
- Doug Hammond: Reflections in the Sea of Nurnen (1972)
- Mel Ellison: Friends (1976)
- San Francisco, Ltd: San Francisco, Ltd. (1977)
- Mark Murphy: Stolen Moments (1978)
- Sarah Metcalf & Tom Peterson: Frank Goes to the Zoo (1995)
- Primo Kim: To Be Near (1997)
- Gerry Grosz: On Ramp (1998)
- Craig Flory: Wigwam Bendix (1998)
