= Gene Bertoncini =

American jazz guitarist (1937–2026)

- Born: April 6, 1937; New York City, U.S.
- Died: August 29, 2026 (aged 89) Englewood, New Jersey, U.S.
- Genres: Jazz
- Occupation: Musician
- Instrument: Guitar
- Years active: 1960s–2026
- Labels: MPS, Stash, Chiaroscuro, Concord, Motéma

Gene Joseph Bertoncini (April 6, 1937 – August 29, 2026) was an American jazz guitarist.

== Life and career ==
Born in New York City on April 6, 1937, Bertoncini grew up in a musical family. His father, Mario Bertoncini (1901–1978), played guitar and harmonica. His brother Renny (1934–2023), played accordion and keyboards. Bertoncini began playing guitar at age seven and by age sixteen was appearing on television. He graduated from high school and attended the University of Notre Dame, where, in 1959, he earned a Bachelor of Science degree in Architectural Engineering. He also played clarinet for the Notre Dame marching band. His first guitar teacher was Johnny Smith.

After college he entered the Marines, then moved to Chicago, where he became immersed in the jazz scene, working with Carmen McRae. He returned to New York City and played with vibraphonist Mike Mainieri and then in one of Buddy Rich's ensembles. He was a member of the Tonight Show band. He also worked with Burt Bacharach, Tony Bennett, Paul Desmond, Benny Goodman, Lena Horne, Hubert Laws, Michel Legrand, Norman Paris, Charles McPherson, Wayne Shorter, Clark Terry, and Nancy Wilson. He performed often with bassist Michael Moore.

Bertoncini was notable in the world of jazz guitar for using a nylon-string guitar in performances and recordings, as Charlie Byrd had done in the 1950s and 1960s. After hearing a Julian Bream album on the advice of his teacher Chuck Wayne, Bertoncini began studying classical guitar and using the instrument for jazz and Latin music styles. Bertoncini discussed his use of the instrument in a 2008 interview:

I started practicing classical guitar just about the time when the bossa nova hit. Joao [Gilberto] was borrowing my guitar, I was playing the classical repertoire, and all these things kind of came together. I was doing studio work at the time, and I got a call to play on a big album by Ahmad Jamal; they wanted somebody to play a bossa nova kind of thing.

From 1990 to 2008, Bertoncini played solo guitar on Sunday and Monday evenings at the Bistro La Madeleine on West 43rd Street in New York City. He recorded two albums of solo guitar arrangements (Body and Soul and Quiet Now) and published ten of these arrangements in Gene Bertoncini Plays Jazz Standards.

He was on the faculties of William Paterson University, New York University, Eastman School of Music, New England Conservatory, and the Banff School of Fine Arts in Alberta, Canada. Bertoncini was also on the staff of the Tritone Jazz Fantasy Camps.

Bertoncini died at the Lillian Booth Actors Home in Englewood, New Jersey, on August 29, 2026, at the age of 89.

== Discography ==
=== As leader ===
- Evolution (Evolution, 1969)
- Bridges with Michael Moore (GJB Music, 1977)
- The Guitar Session with Jay Berliner, Toots Thielemans, Richard Resnicoff (Philips, 1977)
- Crystal & Velvet with Bobbi Rogers (Focus, 1981)
- O Grande Amor with Michael Moore and Edison Machado (Stash, 1986)
- Strollin' with Michael Moore (Stash, 1987)
- Close Ties with Michael Moore (Musical Heritage Society, 1987)
- Two in Time with Michael Moore (Chiaroscuro, 1989)
- Jiggs & Gene with Jiggs Whigham (Azica, 1996)
- Someone to Light Up My Life (Chiaroscuro, 1996)
- Interplay with Fred Haas (JazzToons, 1997)
- Gene Bertoncini with Bill Charlap and Sean Smith (Chiaroscuro, 1999)
- East Meets Midwest with Kenny Poole (J-Curve, 1998)
- Body and Soul (Ambient, 1999)
- Just the Two of Us with Jack Wilkins (Chiaroscuro, 2000)
- Autumn Leaves at Astley's with Frank Vignola (True Track, 2001)
- Meeting of the Grooves with Frank Vignola (Azica, 2002)
- Acoustic Romance with Akira Tana and Rufus Reid (Sons of Sound, 2003)
- Quiet Now (Ambient, 2005)
- Just Above a Whisper (Stellar Sound Productions, 2005)
- Concerti (Ambient, 2008)
- Smile with Roni Ben-Hur (Motéma, 2008)
- 2+2=1 (Blueport Jazz, 2009)
- Reunion (Ambient, 2012)
- Love Like Ours (Ambient, 2022)

=== As sideman ===
- Monty Alexander, Spunky (Pacific Jazz, 1965)
- Duke Pearson, Prairie Dog (Atlantic, 1966)
- Meredith D'Ambrosio, Silent Passion (Sunnyside, 1997)
- David Amram, On the Waterfront on Broadway (Varese Sarabande)
- Chet Baker, The Best Thing for You (A&M, 1989)
- Irwin Bazelon, Music of Irwin Bazelon (1992)
- Harry Belafonte, Loving You Is Where I Belong (Columbia, 1981)
- Tony Bennett, I've Gotta Be Me (Columbia, 1969)
- Peter Bernstein, Mundell Lowe, Jack Wilkins, We Remember Tal (J-Curve, 1999)
- Phil Bodner, Clarinet Virtuosity: Once More with Feeling! (Arbors, 2006)
- Luiz Bonfa, Sanctuary (RCA, 1971)
- Luiz Bonfa, Non-Stop To Brazil (Chesky, 1989)
- Luiz Bonfa, The New Face of Bonfá (RCA/BMG, 2003)
- Luiz Bonfá, The Bonfá Magic (Milestone, 1993)
- Canadian Brass, Swingtime! (RCA Victor, 1995)
- Ron Carter, Blues Farm (CTI, 1973)
- Ron Carter, Blues Base (CTI, 1975)
- Earl Coleman, Love Songs (Atlantic, 1968)
- Dolly Dawn, Memories of You (Dawn, 1981)
- Eumir Deodato, The Best of Deodato In the CTI Years (CTI, 1996)
- Paul Desmond, Bridge Over Troubled Water (A&M, 1970)
- Paul Desmond, Skylark (CTI, 1974)
- Trudy Desmond, Tailor Made (Jazz Alliance, 1992)
- Linda Eder, It's Time (Atlantic, 1997)
- Ronnie Foster, Two-Headed Freap (Blue Note, 1972)
- The Free Design, Stars/Time/Bubbles/Love (Project, 1970)
- Nnenna Freelon, Nnenna Freelon (Columbia, 1992)
- Johnny Frigo, Debut of a Legend (Chesky, 1994)
- Astrud Gilberto, Gilberto with Turrentine (CTI, 1971)
- Astrud Gilberto, That Girl from Ipanema (Audio Fidelity, 1977)
- Bob Hammer, Beatlejazz (ABC-Paramount, 1967)
- Jane Harvey, Jane Harvey (RCA 1974)
- Bobbi Humphrey, Flute-in (Blue Note, 1971)
- Bobby Hutcherson, Natural Illusions (Blue Note, 1972)
- Rufus Jones, Five On Eight (Cameo, 1964)
- Roger Kellaway, Meets the Duo Gene Bertoncini and Michael Moore (Chiaroscuro, 1992)
- Rebecca Kilgore, Rebecca Kilgore with the Keith Ingham Sextet (Jump, 2001)
- Morgana King, Miss Morgana King (Mainstream, 1965)
- Morgana King, A Taste of Honey (Mainstream, 1991)
- Peggy King, Oh What a Memory We Made...Tonight (Stash, 1984)
- Peggy King, Peggy King Sings Jerome Kern (Stash, 1985)
- Hubert Laws, Afro-Classic (CTI, 1970)
- Hubert Laws, The Rite of Spring (CTI, 1971)
- Hubert Laws, Carnegie Hall (CTI, 1972)
- Hubert Laws, In The Beginning (CTI, 1974)
- Hubert Laws,Then There Was Light Vol. 1 (CTI, 1975)
- Hubert Laws, Then There Was Light Vol. 2 (CTI, 1975)
- Michel Legrand, After the Rain (Pablo, 1983)
- Michel Legrand, Twenty Songs of the Century (Bell, 1974)
- Barbara Lewis, It's Magic (Atlantic, 1966)
- Jay Leonhart, Great Duets (Chiaroscuro, 1999)
- Herbie Mann, The Roar of the Greasepaint, the Smell of the Crowd (Atlantic, 1965)
- Susannah McCorkle, How Do You Keep the Music Playing? (1986)
- Susannah McCorkle, Dream (Pausa, 1987)
- Charles McPherson, Charles McPherson (Mainstream, 1971)
- Bette Midler, Some People's Lives (Atlantic, 1990)
- Tony Mottola, A Latin Love-in (Project 3, 1967)
- Mark Murphy, Satisfaction Guaranteed (Muse, 1980)
- Mark Murphy, The Artistry of Mark Murphy (Muse, 1982)
- Gerry Niewood, Facets (Native Language, 2004)
- Duke Pearson, Prairie Dog (Atlantic, 1966)
- Don Sebesky, Sebesky Fantasy (CTI, 1980)
- Lalo Schifrin, Marquis de Sade (Verve, 1966)
- Doc Severinsen, The Great Arrival! (Command, 1969)
- Marlena Shaw, From the Depths of My Soul (Blue Note, 1973)
- Wayne Shorter, Odyssey of Iska (Blue Note, 1971)
- Lonnie Liston Smith, Renaissance (RCA Victor, 1976)
- Lonnie Liston Smith, Watercolors (RCA Victor, 1991)
- Sonny Stitt, When Sonny Blows (Blue Jamal 1970)
- Harvie Swartz, In a Different Light (Bluemoon, 1990)
- Sylvia Syms, She Loves to Hear the Music (A&M, 1978)
- Clark Terry, Clark Terry Sextet (Cameo, 1962)
- Clark Terry, Tread Ye Lightly (Cameo, 1964)
- Toots Thielemans, Toots (Command, ABC 1968)
- Toku, Chemistry of Love (Sony, 2002)
- Michal Urbaniak, Jam at Sandy's (Jam, 1981)
- Michal Urbaniak, My One and Only Love (SteepleChase, 1982)
- Grover Washington Jr., All the King's Horses (Kudu, 1972)
- Harold Wheeler, Black Cream (RCA Victor, 1975)
- Nancy Wilson, But Beautiful (Capitol, 1971)
- Paul Winter, The Winter Consort (A&M, 1968)
- Paul Winter, Something in the Wind (A&M, 1969)
