= Brazil Song (Cancões Do Brasil) =

1983 studio album by Mark Murphy

Studio album by Mark Murphy
- Released: 1984
- Recorded: March 21–22, and August 2 & 4, 1983
- Studio: Russian Hill Recording, San Francisco
- Genre: Vocal jazz
- Length: 33:19
- Label: Muse
- Producer: Lupe De Leon, Mark Murphy

Mark Murphy chronology
The Artistry of Mark Murphy (1982)	Brazil Song (Cancões Do Brasil) (1984)	Mark Murphy Sings the Nat "King" Cole Songbook, Volume One (1985)

Brazil Song (Cancões Do Brasil) is the 20th album by American jazz vocalist Mark Murphy. It was recorded when Murphy was 51 years old in 1983 and released by the Muse label in the United States in 1984. This album is collection of Brazilian jazz songs.

== Background ==
Murphy had recorded Brazilian music previously on Mark Murphy Sings ("Empty Faces"), Who Can I Turn To ("Star Sounds"), Midnight Mood ("Sconsolato"), and others. However, Brazil Song was Murphy's first all-Brazilian jazz album. He later released Night Mood in 1987 dedicated to Ivan Lins. He continued to record many Brazilian songs during his career, singing many of them in Portuguese. In his book A Biographical Guide to the Great Jazz and Pop Singers, Will Friedwald pointed out that Murphy dedicated his late nightclub sets to Brazilian rhythms in his Birdland engagements.

After touring in 1982 Murphy spent two weeks in Rio. He absorbed the music and culture and collected recordings of Brazilian jazz. He was inspired to make an album devoted to the music. In the liner notes to Brazil Song, he told Michael Bloom, "We've lost the great era of singer/songwriters and the Broadway stage. They write musicals but they don't write songs anymore - not songs you can take out and do as independent numbers. I don't hear much new material that knocks me out. So, the best songs now being written are coming from Brazil. It's almost as though they've written into the Brazilian Constitution that it is illegal to write a bad song."

Also in the liner notes Murphy writes about his experience visiting a museum dedicated to Carmen Miranda "who personally brought the Samba (her country's gift to popular music) to the USA and the world". He had been a longtime fan of Miranda after seeing her movies. Murphy dedicated the album to her and to "Elis Regina, the greatest of the contemporary Brazilian singers - who brought us so much joy and excitement and died much too soon" who "must be mentioned in this dedication as well, as must my two new favorite Brazilian lady singers. Rose and Leny Andrade".

== Recording ==
"No one asked me to make this album", Murphy told Bloom in the liner notes. "I did it because I thought that Brazilian songs were not being done correctly - that North American singers have not been able to capture the correct musical pulse of this music, mainly because of the Tin-Pan-Alleyish lyrics given to some of the tunes. The rhythmic pulse has a different timing; I think that's a quality inherent in the Portuguese language. So I try to sing the English lyrics as though they were Portuguese."

The recording was made with a San Francisco-based group, Viva Brasil, who Murphy found to be authentic interpreters of Brazilian songs. "I knew I couldn't do this project with a pickup group," Murphy explained to Bloom. "I had to have a unit, musicians that knew each other well." Jay Wagner, Viva Brasil's keyboardist, did the arranging and played synthesizer. The other members included singer Julia Stewart, percussionist Michael Spiro, pianist Michael Austin-Boe, guitarist Claudio Amaral, and drummer Rubens Moura.

Murphy sings "Outubro" in Portuguese, his first recording in Portuguese. Jones points out in his Murphy biography that many singers prefer original lyrics in Brazilian songs because the English versions tend to drastically change the original meaning. Murphy produced the album with Lupe De Leon, who had worked on Stolen Moments and would go on to produce Night Mood and September Ballads.

== Reception ==
Professional ratings
Review scores
Source	Rating
AllMusic	3/5 stars

Scott Yanow assigns 3 stars to this release in the AllMusic Guide to Jazz.

Author Will Friedwald said, “When it comes to the bossa nova, no other American jazz singer can touch Murphy”.

Murphy biographer Peter Jones singles out "Two Kites", "Nothing Will Be", and "Bridges" for praise.

== Track listing ==
1. "Desafinado" (Antônio Carlos Jobim, Newton Mendonça) – 4:02
2. "Two Kites" (Jobim) – 3:36
3. "The Island" (Ivan Lins, Vítor Martins) – 4:03
4. "Bolero De Satã" (Paulo César Pinheiro, Guinga) – 3:49
5. "She" (Claudio Amaral) – 2:58
6. "Someone to Light Up My Life (Se Todos Fossem Iguais A Voce)" (Jobim, Gene Lees, Vinicius de Moraes) – 2:57
7. "Nothing Will Be" (Ronaldo Bastos, Milton Nascimento, Renee Vincent) – 3:57
8. "Outubro (October)" (Nascimento, Fernando Brant) – 3:58
9. "Bridges" (Brant, Lees, Nascimento) – 3:59

== Personnel ==
Performance

- Mark Murphy – vocals
- Michael Austin-Boe – piano
- Claudio Amaral – guitar
- Rubens Moura – drums
- Chalo Eduardo – percussion
- Michael Spiro – percussion
- Julia Stewart – vocals
- Jay Wagner – synthesizer, arranger

Production

- Jack Leahy – engineer, Russian Hill Recording, San Francisco, Ca. March 21, 22 and August 2 & 4, 1983
- Jeff Kliment – assistant engineer
- Samuel Lehmer – assistant engineer
- Mark Murphy – producer
- Lupe De Leon – producer
- Ron Warwell – album design, cover photography
- Mark Murphy – liner notes
- Michael Bloom – liner notes
- Joe Brescio – mastering, The Cutting Room, NYC
- Chat Chin – back cover photography
