= Sue Evans =

American jazz musician

Sue Evans (born July 7, 1951) is an American jazz, pop, classical, and studio percussionist and drummer.

== Career ==
She was born in New York, New York, United States. Evans played piano, violin and clarinet as a young child before switching to drums. She studied under Warren Smith and Sonny Igoe, and graduated in 1969 from The High School of Music & Art. Later, Evans earned a BA in Music from Columbia University, as well as a Master of Music and Doctorate from the Juilliard School.

Evans soon became one of the top recording percussionists in New York, recording jingles, movie scores, and numerous albums with many jazz, folk and pop artists. She was Judy Collins's touring drummer from 1969 to 1973 and worked with Gil Evans from 1969 to 1982. In the 1970s, she worked with Steve Kuhn, Art Farmer, Bobby Jones, George Benson, Urbie Green and Roswell Rudd's Jazz Composers Orchestra, in addition to playing with The New York Pops, the New York Philharmonic, the Brooklyn Philharmonic and the New Jersey Symphony Orchestra.

In the 1980s, she worked with Michael Franks, Mark Murphy, Suzanne Vega, Tony Bennett, and Morgana King. Other associations include touring or recording with Aretha Franklin, Sting, Spike Lee, James Brown, Billy Cobham, Blood, Sweat & Tears, Philip Glass, Peter, Paul, and Mary, Don Sebesky, Sadao Watanabe, Hubert Laws, Randy Brecker, David Sanborn and Terence Blanchard. She also played at the Tony Awards for several years, as well as the Grammy Awards.

Evans won National Academy of Recording Arts and Sciences Most Valuable Awards in 1984, 1987 and 1989.

== Gil Evans ==
In the notes for the 1988 CD reissue of The Gil Evans Orchestra plays the music of Jimi Hendrix, she wrote:

I started playing with Gil when I was about 17 or 18. I had been studying with Warren for five years or so. Gil used to go up to Warren's studio to rehearse, and our paths crossed often. Sometimes when Warren was out of town, Gil would be there playing the piano and I'd go up there to practise and we started practising together. At that point I didn't even know how great he was. So I wasn't intimidated and I was able to just sit and practise with him for hours. If that had happened years later, I would have tried to second-guess what he wanted.

Then Gil started getting ready to do an album and asked me to join the band. Not only was it my first record date, it was Gil Evans, and Elvin Jones was there! Every time I get interviewed about being a woman musician... well, looking back, it's like I had blinders on. I probably didn't even know how to spell the word discrimination. I just plowed ahead like I was drunk or something. Gil was there, in my life, and I just thought, "Why not?"

Everyone thought Gil was my father for the 8 or 10 years I played with him, and in a sense he was. I was growing up in that band. He kind of found something in me that I didn't know was there and we explored it together. And that's how he was with the whole band.

== Discography ==
With George Benson

- Good King Bad (CTI, 1975)

With Judy Collins

- Living (Elektra, 1971)

With Art Farmer

- Something You Got (CTI, 1977)

With Grant Green

- The Main Attraction (Kudu, 1976)

With Urbie Green

- The Fox (CTI, 1976)
- Señor Blues (CTI, 1977)

With Gil Evans

- Where Flamingos Fly (Artists House, 1971)
- The Gil Evans Orchestra Plays the Music of Jimi Hendrix (RCA, 1974)
- There Comes a Time (RCA, 1976)
- Priestess (Antilles, 1977)
- Gil Evans Live at the Royal Festival Hall London 1978 (RCA, 1978)

With Steve Kuhn

- Trance (ECM, 1974)

With Yusef Lateef

- Autophysiopsychic (CTI, 1977)

With Idris Muhammad

- Turn This Mutha Out (Kudu, 1977)

With Mark Murphy

- Mark II (Muse, 1974)
- Mark Murphy Sings (Muse, 1975)
- The Artistry of Mark Murphy (Muse, 1982)

With Lalo Schifrin

- Black Widow (CTI, 1976)

With Jeremy Steig

- Firefly (CTI, 1977)

With Bob Franke

- For Real (Flying Fish, 1986)
