= Very Early =

1993 studio album by Mark Murphy

Studio album by Mark Murphy
- Released: 1993
- Recorded: 1993
- Studio: Pink Noise Recording Studio, Klagenfurt
- Genre: Vocal jazz
- Length: 56:02
- Label: Wext & East Music
- Producer: Oliver Groenewald

Mark Murphy chronology
One for Junior (1991)	Very Early (1993)	Just Jazz (1993)

Very Early is a 1993 studio album by Mark Murphy.

Very Early is the 31st studio album by American jazz vocalist Mark Murphy. It was recorded in 1993 when Murphy was 61 years old and released by the West & East Music label in Austria in 1993. The album is a collection of standards and jazz tunes with a jazz nonet. Murphy contributes original lyrics to one of the tunes.

== Background ==
Murphy was on staff at the University of Music and Performing Arts Graz, Austria as a vocal instructor 1990-1997 and 2001. In 1993 he recorded an album with some of their students and local professionals. The album was produced by trumpeter Oliver Growenewald who also did the arrangements and was studying at Graz at the time. Growenwald writes, "During my years in Graz, I was able to form my first nine piece band. I was also fortunate to gain experience working with musicians like Mark Murphy and Art Farmer. I had the great chance to write arrangements for Mark Murphy’s CD “Very Early” (West & East, 1992) and the opportunity to perform at Festivals in Montreux, Vienna, Warsaw, and Nancy. During this time, I also met Ack van Rooyen and Chuck Israels, with whom I continued my studies after leaving Graz".

== Recording ==
This release was Oliver Groenewald's first as producer. Groenewald's Nine Piece Band is augmented by Stjepko Gut (trumpet, track 1) and Ewald Gaulhofer (percussion, tracks 1, 7, 11). The nonet includes Oliver Groenewald and Andreas Pesendorfer on trumpets and flugelhorns, Michael Berbaur on trombone, Marko Lackner and Klemens Pliem on saxophones, Thomas Rottleuthner on clarinet and baritone saxophone, Emil Spanyi on piano, Thorsten Zimmermann on bass, and Franz Trattner on drums.

Murphy contributes original lyrics to one of the tunes, "Without Form" with music by Fernando Corrêa. The standards and jazz tunes on this release were never recorded previously by Murphy and were not recorded on any subsequent studio albums. He did perform some of them in his live concerts, including "Everything Happens to Me".

Professional ratings
Review scores
Source	Rating
The Virgin Encyclopedia of Popular Music	3/5 stars

== Reception ==
In his book A Biographical Guide to the Great Jazz and Pop Singers, Will Friedwald said The Dream and "Very Early, with a Viennese nonet known as "Nine", are his best projects with a large ensemble".

Colin Larkin assigns 3 stars to the album in The Virgin Encyclopedia of Popular Music. (3 stars means, "Good. By the artist's usual standards and therefore recommended.").

== Track listing ==
1. "The Song is You" (Jerome Kern, Oscar Hammerstein II) – 5:04
2. "Early Autumn" (Ralph Burns, Woody Herman, Johnny Mercer) – 5:15
3. "A Sleepin' Bee" (Harold Arlen, Truman Capote) – 4:54
4. "Without Form" (Fernando Corrêa, Mark Murphy) – 6:07
5. "I'm All Smiles" (Michael Leonard, Herbert Martin) – 5:04
6. "Duke Ellington's Sound of Love" (Charles Mingus) – 2:50
7. "Love Came on Stealthy Fingers" (Bob Dorough) – 5:25
8. "I Cover the Waterfront" (Johnny Green, Edward Heyman) – 5:08
9. "Very Early" (Bill Evans, Carol Hall) – 5:01
10. "Everything Happens to Me" (Matt Dennis, Tom Adair) – 5:04
11. "Hello Young Lovers" (Richard Rodgers, Oscar Hammerstein II) – 6:10

== Personnel ==
Performance

- Mark Murphy – vocals
- Thorsten Zimmermann – bass
- Emil Spanyi – piano
- Klemens Pliem – tenor saxophone
- Franz Trattner – drums
- Marko Lackner – alto saxophone, soprano saxophone
- Thomas Rottleuthner – baritone saxophone, bass clarinet
- Oliver Groenewald – flugelhorn, trumpet, arranger
- Andy Pesendorfer – flugelhorn, trumpet
- Ewald Gaulhofer – percussion (tracks 1, 7, 11)
- Michael Berbaur – trombone
- Stjepko Gut – trumpet (track 1)
- Ray Anderson – arranger (track 6)
- Sy Johnson – arranger (track 6)

Production

- Franjo Valenic – engineer, recorded at Pink Noise Recording Studio, Klagenfurt, 1993
- Jörg Weitlaner – photography
- Oliver Groenewald – producer
- Harry Huber – executive producer
- Joe Remick – liner notes
- Wolfgang Weitlaner – liner notes
