= Super Bad (James Brown album) =

Live album by James Brown
- Released: January 1971
- Recorded: December 2, 1968 – June 13, 1970
- Studio: King Studios (Cincinnati, Ohio); Starday-King Sound Studios (Nashville, Tennessee)
- Genre: Funk; Soul; R&B
- Length: 33:20
- Label: King
- Producer: James Brown

James Brown chronology
Hey America (1970)	Super Bad (1971)	Sho Is Funky Down Here (1971)

Singles from Super Bad
- 1. "Sometime" Released: October 1969; 2. "Let It Be Me" Released: June 1970; 3. "A Man Has To Go Back To The Crossroads" Released: July 1970; 4. "Super Bad" Released: September 1970

Super Bad is an album, that purports to be a live album, by American musician James Brown. The album was released in 1971 by King Records.

== Chart performance ==
The album debuted on Billboard magazine's Top LP's chart in the issue dated January 31, 1971, peaking at No. 61 during a fifteen-week run on the chart.

== Track listing ==
No.	Title	Writer(s)	Length
1.	"Super Bad, Pt. 1, 2 & 3"	James Brown	9:16
2.	"Let It Be Me"	Gilbert Bécaud, Pierre Delanoë	3:22
3.	"Sometime"	James Brown, Bud Hobgood	3:39
4.	"A Man Has to Go Back to the Crossroads"	James Brown	3:18
5.	"Giving Out of Juice"	Teddy Brown	9:26
6.	"By the Time I Get to Phoenix"	Jimmy Webb	3:05

== Personnel ==
- James Brown – vocals
- Clayton "Chicken" Gunnels, Darryl "Hasaan" Jamison – trumpet
- Robert McCullough – tenor saxophone
- Bobby Byrd – organ
- Phelps "Catfish" Collins – guitar
- William "Bootsy" Collins – bass
- Johnny Griggs – congas
- John "Jabo" Starks – drums

== Charts ==
Chart (1971)	Peak position
US Billboard Top LP's	61
