= Señor Blues (Urbie Green album) =

Studio album by Urbie Green
- Released: 1977
- Recorded: June 1977
- Studio: Electric Lady Studios, NYC
- Genre: Jazz
- Length: 36:57
- Label: CTI; CTI 7079
- Producer: Creed Taylor

Urbie Green chronology
The Fox (1976)	Señor Blues (1977)	Live at Rick's Café Americain (1978)

Señor Blues is an album by American trombonist Urbie Green featuring performances with Grover Washington, Jr. and the David Matthews Big Band recorded in 1977 and released on the CTI label.

== Reception ==
The Allmusic review stated "His first CTI set, The Fox, was quite dull, but this encore is on a much higher level. The trombonist displays his beautiful tone and impressive technique while joined by several horns and an expanded rhythm section .

Professional ratings
Review scores
Source	Rating
Allmusic	4/5 stars

== Track listing ==
1. "Captain Marvel" (Chick Corea) - 6:32
2. "You Are So Beautiful" (Bruce Fisher, Billy Preston) - 2:58
3. "Ysabel's Table Dance" (Charles Mingus) - 8:40
4. "Señor Blues" (Horace Silver) - 7:45
5. "I'm in You" (Peter Frampton) - 6:40
6. "I Wish" (Stevie Wonder) - 4:22

- Recorded at Electric Lady Studios in New York City in June 1977

== Personnel ==
- Urbie Green - trombone
- Grover Washington, Jr. - tenor saxophone, soprano saxophone
- David Matthews - electric piano, arranger
- Burt Collins, Joe Shepley - trumpet, flugelhorn
- Sam Burtis - trombone
- Tony Price - tuba
- Fred Griffin - French horn
- Frank Vicari - tenor saxophone
- David Tofani - soprano saxophone, flute
- Kenny Berger - baritone saxophone, bass clarinet
- John Scofield - electric guitar
- Harvie Swartz - bass
- Jim Madison - drums
- Sue Evans - percussion
