= Ben Aronov =

American jazz pianist

- Birth name: Benjamin James Aronov
- Born: October 16, 1932; Gary, Indiana, U.S.
- Origin: Tulsa, Oklahoma, U.S.
- Died: May 3, 2015 (aged 82); Aix-en-Provence, France
- Genres: Jazz, musical theatre
- Instruments: Piano

Benjamin James Aronov (October 16, 1932 – May 3, 2015) was an American jazz pianist, professionally known as Ben Aronov or Benny Aronov.

== Early life ==
Aronov was born in Gary, Indiana. He played in local jazz and dance ensembles as a teenager in Tulsa, Oklahoma. He was a student at the University of Tulsa in 1951 and 1952, then was conscripted into the United States Army and was stationed in Texas, where he played in a military band. After leaving the Army, he attended the Manhattan School of Music, earning a bachelor's degree in music in 1966.

== Career ==
In 1954, Aronov moved to Los Angeles and began playing at the Lighthouse and with Terry Gibbs, June Christy, and Lena Horne. In 1961, he moved to New York City. He worked with Al Cohn, Benny Goodman, Jim Hall, Morgana King, Lee Konitz, Peggy Lee, Liza Minnelli, George Mraz, Mark Murphy, the National Jazz Ensemble, Ken Peplowski, Tom Pierson, Zoot Sims, Carol Sloane, and Warren Vaché Jr. He played piano in the Broadway production of Cats from 1982 to 2000. After this, he moved to Aix-en-Provence, where he remained until his death in 2015.
