= Something You Got =

Studio album by Art Farmer
- Released: 1977
- Recorded: July 1977
- Studio: Electric Lady Studios, New York City
- Genre: Jazz
- Length: 40:43
- Label: CTI; CTI 7080
- Producer: Creed Taylor

Art Farmer chronology
Crawl Space (1977)	Something You Got (1977)	Art Farmer Live in Tokyo (1977)

Something You Got is an album by American flugelhornist Art Farmer featuring performances with Yusef Lateef and the David Matthews Big Band recorded in 1977 and released on the CTI label.

== Reception ==
The Allmusic review stated "The meeting of trumpeter Art Farmer and reed king Yusef Lateef with pianist/arranger David Matthews fronting a big band is a momentous one. The relaxed pace of the set, with its reliance on easy jazz-funk (the title track) and extended funky workouts with stunning hard bop charts by Matthews on "Flute Song," makes for one of the most provocative looks at groove jazz in the CTI label's history".

Professional ratings
Review scores
Source	Rating
Allmusic	4/5 stars
The Rolling Stone Jazz Record Guide	2/5 stars

== Track listing ==
All compositions by David Matthews except as indicated

1. "Something You Got" (Chris Kenner) - 6:17
2. "Flute Song" - 8:12
3. "Saudhade" (Fritz Pauer) - 5:55
4. "Sandu" (Clifford Brown) - 7:24
5. "Spain" (Chick Corea) - 5:50
6. "Hombre del Sol" - 7:05

- Recorded at Electric Lady Studios in New York City in July 1977

== Personnel ==
- Art Farmer - flugelhorn
- Yusef Lateef - tenor saxophone
- David Matthews - electric piano, arranger
- Burt Collins, Joe Shepley - trumpet, flugelhorn
- Sam Burtis - trombone
- Tony Price - tuba
- Fred Griffin - French horn
- Frank Vicari - tenor saxophone
- David Tofani - soprano saxophone, flute
- Kenny Berger - baritone saxophone, bass clarinet
- Hiram Bullock - electric guitar
- Harvie Swartz - bass
- Jim Madison - drums
- Sue Evans - percussion
