= One for Junior =

1991 studio album by Mark Murphy

Studio album by Sheila Jordan and Mark Murphy
- Released: 1993
- Recorded: September 24, 1991
- Studio: Sear Sound, New York City
- Genre: Vocal jazz
- Length: 56:46
- Label: Muse Records
- Producer: Sheila Jordan, Mark Murphy

Mark Murphy chronology
I'll Close My Eyes (1991)	One for Junior (1993)	Very Early (1993)

One for Junior is a 1991 studio album by Mark Murphy.

One for Junior is the 30th studio album by American jazz vocalist Mark Murphy. The album is a collaboration with Sheila Jordan. It was recorded in 1991 when Murphy was 59 years old and released by the Muse label in the United States in 1993. The album is a tribute to Junior Morrow. Murphy contributes the composition "One for Junior", co-written with Sheila Jordan.

== Background ==
Sheila Jordan and Mark Murphy were longtime friends. After a concert they gave together in Cleveland in 1991 they decided to record an album together for Muse. Murphy and Jordan met at her home in New York to decide on the material they would include. In the title for the album, "Junior" is a reference to painter Helen Mayer, a longtime friend of Jordan and Murphy. Mayer called herself Junior Morrow. The album cover is a photograph of one of her original paintings. Mayer died before the album was recorded.

In the liner notes both Jordan and Murphy recount stories and memories of Helen Mayer. Both write about encounters at The Page Three nightclub in Greenwich Village owned by Jacquie Howe. Mayer frequented the night club, painted a mural there and Murphy and Jordan often performed at the club. Jordan first heard Murphy sing at Page Three. The three became friends there.

The song "Difficult to Say Goodbye" was written for Murphy by singer and songwriter Ellen Hoffman. She writes, "I had written the song for him upon the death of his life-time partner, Eddie. A few years later he recorded it on a duo-album with Sheila Jordan...part of a 2-song medley. Sheila is singing "Don't Like GoodByes", (written by composer Harold Arlen) and Mark is singing my song".

== Recording ==
Murphy and Jordan recorded the material for this release in September 1991 at Sear Sound in New York City. Pianist Kenny Barron, bassist Harvie Swartz, and drummer Ben Riley who had recorded with Jordan on Lost and Found (Muse, 1990) were enlisted for the backup trio. Pianist Bill Mays who had recorded, arranged and produced multiple Murphy albums including Bop for Kerouac, Beauty and the Beast, and Kerouac, Then and Now, joined the group for the two George Gruntz tracks. The Gruntz compositions were from operas he composed; "Aria 18" is from Money: A Jazz Opera, and "Eastern Ballad" is from Cosmopolitan Greetings. Gruntz, Murphy and Jordan were supposed to work together on Money but Murphy was not available at the time of production. Murphy did perform, tour and record the opera Cosmopolitan Greetings.

There were some problems during the recording. Sheila Jordan thought she sounded shrill on "One for Junior". Murphy had problems during the recording of the medley (track 9). He wanted the tempo to be very slow for his part, singing Hoffman's "Difficult to Say Goodbye", and insisted they slow down. Murphy was having trouble "reading the music because of the way it was spread out across his music stand – again he regretted forgetting his glasses. He had to weave his head to see it better, and the microphone picked up the changes in his position".

Professional ratings
Review scores
Source	Rating
The Virgin Encyclopedia of Popular Music	4/5 stars
AllMusic Guide to Jazz	4.5/5 stars

== Reception ==
Scott Yanow assigns 4.5 stars to this release on AllMusic. He said, "This CD is a real gem...On a typically intelligent and chance taking program there are many highlights including a humorous conversation between hipsters on "Where or When," a couple of ballad medleys and Jordan's witty lyrics on "The Bird"". Yanow includes the release in his list of some of the best individual Muse sets in his book The Jazz Singers: The Ultimate Guide.

Colin Larkin assigns 4 stars to the album in The Virgin Encyclopedia of Popular Music. (4 stars means, "Excellent. A high standard album from this artist and therefore highly recommended").

== Track listing ==
1. "Where You At?" (George Handy, Jack Segal) – 6:27
2. "Round About / It All Goes Round" (Vernon Duke, Ogden Nash / David Foster) – 6:26
3. "One for Junior" (Sheila Jordan, Mark Murphy) – 7:58
4. "Trust in Me" (Milton Ager, Jean Schwartz, Ned Wever) – 6:34
5. "The Bird: Tribute (Quasimodo) / Embraceable You" (Charlie Parker, S. Jordan / George Gershwin, Ira Gershwin) – 7:07
6. "Aria 18" (George Gruntz, Amiri Baraka) – 5:29
7. "The Best Thing for You" (Irving Berlin) – 4:41
8. "Eastern Ballad" (George Gruntz, Allen Ginsberg) – 7:14
9. "Don't Like Goodbyes / Difficult to Say Goodbye" (Harold Arlen, Truman Capote / Ellen Hoffman) – 4:50

== Personnel ==
Performance

- Mark Murphy – vocals
- Harvie Swartz – bass
- Kenny Barron – piano
- Bill Mays – piano, synthesizer (tracks 6, 8)
- Ben Riley – drums

Production

- Michael MacDonald – engineer, recorded at Sear Sound, New York
- Mark Murphy – photography
- Dave Pistoni – photography
- Sheila Jordan – producer
- Mark Murphy – producer
- Helen Mayer – original painting
- Anita Brown – photograph of painting
- Sheila Jordan – liner notes
- Mark Murphy – liner notes
- Michael Bourne – liner notes
- Dick Smith – art direction
