= Kenny Poole =

American jazz musician

Kenny Poole (1947 – May 27, 2006) was an American jazz guitarist, a prominent musician on the Cincinnati musical scene. Allaboutjazz.com referred to him as a "guitarist's guitarist" and noted his "soulful and sophisticated finger-style arrangements". He was particularly accomplished at bossa nova and chord melody solo playing.

== Biography ==
Poole began playing the guitar at the age of 14, after hearing Chet Atkins's album Finger Style Guitar. He became a professional musician in 1966. Poole was a member of James Brown's band from 1970 to 1974. During his career, he played with Jack McDuff, Tal Farlow, Joe Pass, Howard Alden, Jack Wilkins, Groove Holmes, Mark Murphy, Barney Kessel, Herb Ellis, Jimmy Raney, Mundell Lowe, Cal Collins, Howard Alden, Jimmy Bruno, and others. For most of his career, he supported himself playing in local bars and restaurants in Cincinnati, and preferred not to travel. In the 1980s he performed regularly with fellow Cincinnati guitarist Cal Collins as a guitar duo.

Poole died of cancer in 2006. The book Ohio Jazz: A History of Jazz in the Buckeye State referred to him as "a legend in Cincinnati". In honor of Poole, the Cincinnati radio station WVXU aired a two-hour special on the first anniversary of his death on May 27, 2007, featuring a range of friends and fellow musicians including Steve Schmidt and Andy Brown. In 2012, a live album featuring his solo performances at Cincinnati's Heritage Restaurant was released under the title Heritage.

== Discography ==
- East Meets Midwest with Gene Bertoncini (J Curve, 1998)
- For George: Tribute to a Master (J Curve, 1999)
- Heritage (Stork Music, 2012)
