= September Ballads =

Studio album by Mark Murphy
- Released: 1988
- Recorded: September 15–17, 1987 and November 8 and 22, 1987
- Studios: Fantasy Studios, Berkeley, California
- Genre: Vocal jazz
- Length: 50:00
- Label: Milestone
- Producer: Larry Dunlap

Mark Murphy chronology
Night Mood: The Music of Ivan Lins (1987)	September Ballads (1988)	Kerouac, Then and Now (1989)

September Ballads is a 1987 studio album by Mark Murphy.

September Ballads is the 27th recorded album by American jazz vocalist Mark Murphy. It was recorded when Murphy was 55 years old and released by Milestone Records in the United States in 1989. The release is an all-ballad session featuring the work of then contemporary composers.

Mark Murphy recorded September Ballads in three days in September and two days in November 1987 with producer and arranger Larry Dunlap. Murphy is accompanied by guests Larry Coryell on electric guitar and Art Farmer on flugelhorn.

The release includes Murphy's own lyrics to Pat Metheny and Lyle Mays's "September Fifteenth" and his original composition "Sausalito".

== Background ==
In the biography This Is Hip: The Life of Mark Murphy by Peter Jones, Murphy is quoted as saying, "It's a truism that ballads are a singer's biggest challenge. In fact, it's like you're doing a small movie on the fly – you're in it, you're telling the story, creating the mood and sustaining it. You've got nothing to hide behind." Murphy calls the songs on the release "new standards".

Murphy explains, "Some of these songs are newish and some have been unjustly neglected. Most have been with me a long time. 'When This Love Affair Is Over,' for instance, I heard 20 years ago in New York. It was a track on a Peter Allen album, and it just stuck in my mind. And Gary McFarland's 'Sack Full of Dreams' – I've almost recorded it many times, and finally decided now was the time to do it."

Murphy, discussing the songs says, "The Michael Franks tune 'When She Is Mine,' I'm amazed no one else has picked up on it, it's a fantastic song. And Steve Allen's 'Spring Is Where You Are' – I used to go on his old show and sing his songs, and that was always my favorite of all the stuff he'd written".

Murphy contributes lyrics to Pat Metheny and Lyle Mays's "September Fifteenth" and an original composition "Sausalito", which was originally written in the 50s, rewritten and recorded in the 60s and released on Bridging a Gap in 1973, and now re-recorded in a new arrangement by Larry Dunlap.

Speaking to Dan Ouellette, in a feature in DownBeat in 1997 Murphy is quoted as saying, "I love doing ballads. That's when I feel I can communicate one-to-one with listeners. People tell me that it's as if I'm singing directly to them. I've been a part of marriages and divorce settlements, child conceptions and wakes, my fans keep my albums for years. They come up to me at my live shows with these scratchy LPs and ask me to sign them. I never sold a million albums, but those I did sell are still out there. Shirley [Horn], Sheila [Jordan] and I seem to be the last of our generation. But the gold is that when you reach maturity as vocalists, you begin to sing your life. You're not just performing. You're putting your life into your songs."

In his book, This is Hip: The Life of Mark Murphy, author Peter Jones writes that "The liner notes pointed out that he [Murphy] was now hitting his stride as a revered elder statesman of jazz: "Mark Murphy is an international jazz figure who tours Europe several times a year, appearing in clubs, concerts, festivals, and television programs. He was the subject of a TV special in Yugoslavia, Denmark, Sweden, and Britain, and has been seen on PBS stations in this country. Murphy has also played to enthusiastic audiences in Japan and Australia".

Speaking about his favorite personal recordings with Ted Pankin years later, Murphy said, "I loved a ballad album I did for Fantasy called September Ballads, which includes that "Goodbye" song to Bill Evans and some beautiful pieces by writers of the '70s, which I'm very surprised that people who sing my type of songs don't pick up on. So there you are".

== Recording ==
Mark Murphy recorded September Ballads in three days in September and two days in November 1987 with producer and arranger Larry Dunlap. Murphy is accompanied by guests Larry Coryell on electric guitar and Art Farmer on flugelhorn.

Peter Jones says, "It's a soft, gentle album, richly melodic, played straight, with no unorthodox arrangements or challenging scat experiments". The recordings include "September Fifteenth" by Pat Metheny and Lyle Mays which refers to the day in 1980 when Bill Evans died; Gary McFarland's "haunting" "Sack Full of Dreams"; Richard Rodney Bennett's "I Never Went Away"; "Para Nada" ("For Nothing") by Brazilian singer and pianist Eliane Elias; and "a gentle, lilting new version" of Murphy's own Sausalito. An additional five tunes were recorded but weren't included in the final release. "For me it was a very expensive album. We ran up huge mixing bills, the sessions were long... but the album was wonderful. I expected some promotion from the company [Fantasy], but they didn't give any" complained Murphy.

== Reception ==
Professional ratings
Review scores
Source	Rating
Virgin Encyclopedia of Popular Music	3/5 stars
AllMusic	4/5 stars
MusicHound Jazz	(4.5)/5 stars
The Penguin Guide to Jazz	(3)/4 stars
Rolling Stone Jazz & Blues Album Guide	4/5 stars

Murphy was nominated for Best Jazz Vocal Performance, Male for September Ballads at the 31st annual Grammy Awards in 1988. Peter Jones writes, "In February he [Murphy] had been briefly elated by the news that September Ballads had received a Grammy nomination - his fourth in the category Best Jazz Vocal Performance, Male. This time he was beaten by Bobby McFerrin with "Brothers", a duet with Rob Wasserman".

Published reviews and discussions include the following:

The AllMusic entry gives the album 4 stars.

Scott Yanow includes the album in his list of "other worthy recordings" by Mark Murphy in his book The Jazz Singers: The Ultimate Guide.

The Virgin Encyclopedia of Popular Music rates the release as good (3/5, meaning by the artist's usual standards and therefore recommended).

Andre Gilbert assigns the album 4.5 bones in MusicHound Jazz: The Essential Album Guide calling it "an album only Mark Murphy could pull off", featuring "more range than most singers cover in a career", turning each tune "into an effective jazz vehicle" and calling Dunlap's arrangements and the flugelhorn accompaniment by Art Farmer, the electric guitar by Larry Coryell and the acoustic guitar by Oscar Castro-Neve's "gorgeous".

The Penguin Guide to Jazz assigns 3 stars (meaning a good if middleweight set; one that lacks the stature or consistency of the finest records, but which is certainly rewarding on its own terms) and the review says. "Nothing really stands out on the pleasing but muted September Ballads".

John Swenson, in The Rolling Stone Jazz & Blues Album Guide, assigns the album 4 stars (excellent) and writes, "Murphy's Milestone recordings are magnificent vocal sets: September Ballads collects what Murphy calls 'contemporary standards' that showcase his rich baritone and shrewd harmonic sense".

Chris Albertson, writing a 1988 review of the album in Stereo Review, calls the album "very good" finding Murphy to be "at his best when he sings simply. That's what he does in September Ballads, a quiet, tasteful album with superb accompaniments by a group that includes guitarist Larry Coryell and Art Farmer on flugelhorn. There's not a smidgen of the pretentiousness that sometimes mars Murphy's work, just a set of ballads sung in a delightful, relaxing style. The program is not the usual collection of evergreens but is nicely varied and includes Murphy's own Sausalito."

== Track listing ==
1. "September Fifteenth" (Pat Metheny, Lyle Mays, Mark Murphy) – 5:26
2. "When She is Mine" (Michael Franks) – 5:46
3. "When This Love Affair is Over" (Peter Allen, David Foster) – 5:07
4. "Night Life" (Walt Breeland, Paul Buskirk, Willie Nelson) – 4:20
5. "Sack Full of Dreams" (Gary McFarland, Louis Savary) – 5:33
6. "Crystal Silence" (Chick Corea, Neville Potter) – 3:57
7. "I Never Went Away" (Sir Richard Rodney Bennett) – 5:04
8. "Sausalito" (Mark Murphy) – 3:46
9. "Para Nada" (Eliane Elias) – 4:52
10. "Spring Is Where You Are" (Steve Allen) – 5:35

== Personnel ==
Performance

- Mark Murphy – vocals
- J David Belove – bass (tracks 1,6,7,9)
- Jeff Carney – bass (tracks 5,8,10)
- Scott Steed – bass (tracks 2,3,4)
- Larry Coryell – electric guitar
- Vince Lateano – drums
- Oscar Castro‐Neves – guitar (tracks 1,6,7,9)
- Bob Mocarsky – synthesizer
- Larry Dunlap – piano, arranger, and on track 8 background vocal
- John Santos – percussion (all except 2,3,10)
- Art Farmer – flugelhorn (tracks 2,5,7)
- Donald Bailey – harmonica (tracks 2,3,4)

Production

- Danny Kopelson – engineer
- Larry Dunlap – producer
- Lupe De Leon – co-producer
- Phil Carroll – art direction
- George Horn – mastering
- Phil Bray – photography
- Jamie Putnam – photography
- Cleo Laine – liner notes
