= Satisfaction Guaranteed (Mark Murphy album) =

1979 studio album by Mark Murphy

- Photography by T. Armor

Studio album by Mark Murphy
- Released: 1980
- Recorded: November 21, 1979
- Studio: Nola Recording Studio, New York
- Genre: Vocal jazz
- Length: 40:22
- Label: Muse Records
- Producer: Mitch Farber

Mark Murphy chronology
Stolen Moments (1978)	Satisfaction Guaranteed (1980)	Bop for Kerouac (1981)

Satisfaction Guaranteed is a 1979 studio album by Mark Murphy.

Satisfaction Guaranteed is the 17th album by American jazz vocalist Mark Murphy. It was recorded when Murphy was 47 years old and released by the Muse Records label in the United States in 1980. The release is a collection of contemporary tunes and standards dedicated to Eddie Jefferson. Saxophonist Richie Cole makes his second appearance on an album with Murphy. Murphy was nominated for a 1980 Grammy award for Best Jazz Vocal Performance, Male at the 23rd annual awards for the album.

== Background ==
The recording was dedicated to Eddie Jefferson, who was shot and killed outside Baker's Keyboard Lounge in Detroit on May 8, 1979, aged 60. Both Murphy and Cole were closely associated with Jefferson. Cole performed with Jefferson on five releases on Muse and in concert. Cole was performing with Jefferson during his engagement at Baker's Keyboard Lounge and was walking out of the club with Jefferson when he was shot and killed. He composed a tribute to Jefferson, "Eddie Jefferson", which Murphy recorded on his album Kerouac, Then and Now. In a Down Beat feature in October 1980, Cole said, “It was easy for Eddie and I to blend our styles, because we shared the same kind of feeling. I knew Eddie for about five years. He was a master of show business and a master of music, and he definitely influenced the way I play today".

Jefferson is credited as one of the innovators of vocalese, adding lyrics to a jazz musician's improvised solo on a tune. This had a big influence on Murphy who recorded many vocalese classics and who went on to write his own. Speaking about his career by the 1970s in an interview for The Calgary Herald, Murphy said, "Pure jazz was really the only place that was not overcrowded, so I went there, towards where Jon Hendricks and Eddie Jefferson were, and that's where I carved my niche. I'm certainly one of the last of that era still doing it''.

== Recording ==
The album was produced and arranged by Mitch Farber, a jazz saxophonist who also wrote and produced for Jackie McLean, Red Garland, Morgana King, Richie Cole, Pepper Adams, and Walter Bishop Jr. Farber produced and arranged another Mark Murphy release, Stolen Moments, also on Muse Records.

Mike Renzi, a pianist well known for working with singers Peggy Lee, Lena Horne, Mel Tormé, Cleo Laine, Blossom Dearie and Jack Jones, provides piano accompaniment for Murphy. Richie Cole, on alto saxophone, had previously worked with Murphy on Stolen Moments. Jimmy Madison, who previously worked with Murphy on Bridging a Gap, Mark II and Sings, accompanies on drums. Trumpeter Tom Harrell makes his first of three appearances on Murphy albums.

Mark Egan accompanies on bass, Ray Mantilla on percussion on track A4, Ronnie Cuber on baritone saxophone, Gene Bertoncini on guitar, Slide Hampton on trombone, and Steve Bramson is the arranger on tracks A4 and B1. The rhythm parts of "Waltz for Debbie", track B3, had been previously arranged for Murphy by Richard Rodney Bennett when Murphy was living in London.

Composer Alec Wilder was present during the recording of his ballad "Welcome Home". Wilder had become a big Murphy supporter and had Murphy on his Peabody Award-winning NPR radio show “American Popular Song with Alec Wilder and Friends”. The appearance was released in 1977 as Mark Murphy Sings Mostly Dorothy Fields & Cy Coleman (Audiophile).

The medley on track A3 was devised as a tribute to Etta Jones. "Don't Go To Strangers" was a 1960 hit for Jones on the album Don't Go To Strangers. The album was Etta Jones' first album for the independent jazz label Prestige and the song went gold, hitting the Top 40 on the pop charts (peaking at #36 on 1960/12/17) and reaching number five on the R&B charts (1960/12/26). "Don't Misunderstand" was released by Jones with Houston Person on the album My Mother's Eyes for Muse Records in 1978.

Professional ratings
Review scores
Source	Rating
The Rolling Stone Jazz Record Guide	4/5 stars
The Virgin Encyclopedia of Popular Music	4/5 stars
AllMusic	4/5 stars

== Reception ==
Murphy's performance on Satisfaction Guaranteed was nominated for a 1980 Grammy award for Best Jazz Vocal Performance, Male at the 23rd annual awards. This was Murphy's first nomination for a vocal performance and it lost to George Benson, for Moody's Mood.

The Virgin Encyclopedia of Popular Music assigns 4 stars (meaning, "Excellent. A high standard album from this artist and therefore highly recommended). The Rolling Stone Jazz Record Guide assigns the album four stars (meaning, "Excellent: Four-star albums represent peak performances in an artist's career. Generally speaking, albums that are granted four or more stars constitute the best introductions to an artist's work for listeners who are curious").

Murphy biographer Peter Jones calls the album a "relaxed, accessible, warm and - as promised in the title - satisfying recording, on which Murphy is at his least self-indulgent".

AllMusic assigns a score of 4 stars. Reviewer Ron Wynn wrote, "Good '79 session with vocalist Mark Murphy putting his stamp on old standards and new tunes, scatting, vocalizing, and extending them in his fiery, dynamic way."

== Track listing ==
Issued as Vinyl LP. No CD reissue.

Side A

1. "Satisfaction Guaranteed" (Michael Franks) – 5:22
2. "Eleanor Rigby" (John Lennon, Paul McCartney) – 5:31
3. "Don't Go To Strangers" / "Don't Misunderstand" (Arthur Kent, Redd Evans, David Mann / Gordon Parks) – 5:40
4. "Bijou" (Ralph Burns, Jon Hendricks) – 3:30

Side B

1. "All the Things You Are" (Jerome Kern, Oscar Hammerstein II) – 6:00
2. "Welcome Home" (Judy Holliday, Alec Wilder) – 5:22
3. "Waltz for Debby" (Bill Evans, Gene Lees) – 3:38
4. "I Return To Music" (Kirby Shaw, Gayle Landess) – 5:19

== Personnel ==
Performance

- Mark Murphy – vocals,
- Mark Egan – bass
- Ray Mantilla – percussion on track A4
- Mike Renzi – piano
- Jimmy Madison – drums
- Richie Cole – alto saxophone
- Ronnie Cuber – baritone saxophone
- Gene Bertoncini – guitar
- Slide Hampton – trombone
- Tom Harrell – trumpet
- Steve Bramson – arranger on tracks A4 and B1
- Richard Rodney Bennett – rhythm arranger on track B3

Production

- Malcolm Addey – engineer
- Mitch Farber – producer
- T. Armor – photography
- Mark Larson – design
- Fred Bouchard – liner notes
