= I'll Close My Eyes (Mark Murphy album) =

Studio album by Mark Murphy
- Released: 1991 (1994 CD release)
- Recorded: December 16–17, 1991
- Genre: Vocal jazz
- Length: 36:55
- Label: Muse
- Producer: Larry Fallon

Mark Murphy chronology
What a Way to Go (1990)	I'll Close My Eyes (1991)	Night Mood (1991)

I'll Close My Eyes is a 1991 studio album by Mark Murphy.

== Reception ==
Professional ratings
Review scores
Source	Rating
AllMusic	4/5 stars
MusicHound Jazz	4.5/5 stars

The AllMusic review by Scott Yanow described Murphy's recordings for Muse Records as "...among the most rewarding of his career", adding that "His eccentric improvising is an acquired taste worth gaining...An interesting outing that sounds quite contemporary while tied to the jazz tradition." The All About Jazz reviewer wrote: "I'll Close My Eyes is a classic and should be a part of every serious jazz lover's CD collection."

Andrew Gilbert writing in MusicHound Jazz: The Essential Album Guide assigns the album 4.5 bones and says, "Murphy turns everything he sings into jazz. He even transforms the moldy old Bread tune "If" into a torchy ballad".

== Track listing ==
1. "I'll Close My Eyes" (Buddy Kaye, Billy Reid) – 5:36
2. "If" (David Gates) – 3:19
3. "Happyin'" (Flip Nunez) – 4:06
4. "Miss You Mr. Mercer" (Duncan Lamont, Jack Segal) – 5:05
5. "Small World" (Reuben Brown) – 3:09
6. "There Is No Reason Why" (Patti Linardos) – 3:42
7. "Time on My Hands" (Harold Adamson, Mack Gordon, Vincent Youmans) – 4:05
8. "Ugly Woman" (Howlett Smith) – 5:07
9. "Not Like This" (Jeremy Lubbock) – 2:46

== Personnel ==
- Mark Murphy – vocals
- David Finck – double bass
- Peter Grant – drums
- Jay Messina – engineer
- John Basile – guitar
- Cliff Carter – keyboards
- Sammy Figueroa – percussion
- Pat Rebillot – piano
- Claudio Roditi – trumpet
- Larry Fallon – arranger, producer
