= Stolen Moments (Mark Murphy album) =

- Cover photography by Clarence Eastmond

Studio album by Mark Murphy
- Released: 1978
- Recorded: June 1, 1978
- Studio: Filmways/Helder Studio, San Francisco
- Genre: Vocal jazz
- Length: 36:00
- Label: Muse Records
- Producer: Mitch Farber

Mark Murphy chronology
Mark Murphy Sings Mostly Dorothy Fields & Cy Coleman (1977)	Stolen Moments (1978)	Satisfaction Guaranteed (1979)

Stolen Moments is a 1978 studio album by Mark Murphy.

Stolen Moments is the 16th album by American jazz vocalist Mark Murphy. It was recorded when Murphy was 46 years old and released by the Muse Records label in the United States in 1978. The recording is noted for the title tune and was one of Murphy's more successful releases. Murphy contributes the lyrics to Oliver Nelson's "Stolen Moments" which became a signature tune for Murphy. Richie Cole is featured on alto saxophone.

== Background ==
The instrumental "Stolen Moments" from The Blues and the Abstract Truth (1961) by Oliver Nelson, one of the best selling jazz albums, was a successful jazz standard by the time Murphy recorded his version. Author Ted Gioia calls the tune "a querulous hard-bop chart that...sounds almost painfully sophisticated".

Murphy told John Watson in an interview that when he first arrived in the UK in 1964, the Oliver Nelson record was getting a lot of play and the song "Stolen Moments" stuck with him. He was inspired to write the lyrics. He said, "I like what the lyrics say about two people snatching time to be together, not giving a damn about what the rest of the world says.’’ He sang the song at Ronnie Scott's Jazz Club. He also sang it in tour in Europe. Then he put it away for about 10 years. Peter Jones recounts in his biography,This is Hip: The Life of Mark Murphy, that in the late 1970s Murphy was looking through his charts when he re-discovered the lyrics for "Stolen Moments". Murphy said, "I started to do it at the clubs, and the kids liked it, and were always asking, 'Can you do that "Stolen Moments" again'?" So Murphy got the idea to do a big band album. He and Joe Fields, from Muse, enlisted Mitch Farber to do the arrangements and hire the musicians.

Up until two days before the recording session Murphy had intended the centerpiece of the album to be Joe Zawinul's "Birdland". But permission to record the song with Murphy's own lyrics was denied. The tune would be featured on The Manhattan Transfer's 1979 release Extensions with lyrics by Jon Hendricks, which would win the 1981 Grammy Award for Best Jazz Fusion Performance. Incidentally, Richie Cole appears on the Manhattan Transfer's album.

Murphy's recording of "Stolen Moments" received a lot of airplay in the US and became a favorite in his live performances. It became a signature tune for Murphy. Years later, in 1995, the Canadian dance company Decidedly Jazz Danceworks produced a 1940s detective movie spoof in dance entitled "Stolen Moments" which was built around Murphy's music. Artistic director Vicki Adams Willis and Michèle Moss choreographed dance to the song and others from Murphy's repertoire as part of a show in Calgary that featured Murphy narrating and vocalizing in a trench coat in the second act. "I guess there's some kind of dance connection in my singing,'' Murphy said, "because I was discovered by Sammy Davis Jr., one of the world's greatest tap dancers''.

Murphy's first recording of the song was for Dutch radio in 1970 and it also appears on North Sea Jazz Sessions, Volume 5, a collection of 1970s recordings with the Louis Vandyke Trio released in 1992. An extended 13 minute version of "Stolen Moments" with two scat solos is included on the live set Just Jazz from 1993 with the Karlheinz Miklin Quartet from a concert in Graz, Austria. Three versions of the song are also prominently featured later in Murphy's career on his album Love is What Stays with Till Brönner in 2007.

== Recording ==
Mitch Farber did the arrangements and brought in the session musicians. He worked closely with Murphy, saying, "He knows precisely what he wants to hear and what the charts must do.’’ Murphy did the vocal arrangements himself. Richie Cole is featured extensively on alto saxophone. They had been performing together in San Francisco jazz clubs. Cole would have a close association with Murphy, appearing on Satisfaction Guaranteed (Muse, 1980) and Bop for Kerouac (Muse, 1981). Cole's tune "D.C. Farewell" is also included on Stolen Moments.

Vince Lateano is on drums and would later appear on Murphy's September Ballads in 1988. In the liner notes Murphy says, ‘‘I’m always a time singer. I bounce off the time values...I must have a wonderful drummer who agrees with me on that time conception. That’s what generates my motors!’’ The bass players are Chuck Metcalf and Paul Breslin. Jack Gobbetti is on percussion, and he makes a later appearance with Murphy on the 2017 HighNote release Wild and Free: Live at the Keystone Korner from a 1980 concert. The remainder of the band includes Smith Dobson on piano, Jim Nichols on guitar, Mark Levine on trombone, and Warren Gale on trumpet.

Murphy records "Waters of March" by Antônio Carlos Jobim on this release and his version is considered definitive by some critics. Will Friedwald credits Murphy as the earliest American jazz singer to sing it, saying, "His treatment of "Waters" has an urgency, a dynamism not heard in those of other singers, North or South American," and "The Waters of March" might as well be "The Waters of Mark".

Murphy records Annie Ross' vocalese lyrics to Art Farmer's "Farmer's Market". Peter Jones says that though Ross "wrote the bonkers" lyrics it was Mark Murphy who was "the one who really nailed the vocal, rendering Ross's tongue-twisters effortlessly despite the suicidal tempo". Though Murphy had previously recorded the tune, this was its first release. Jones says, "His extraordinary verbal facility is on show in this tricky all-vocal/no solos Art Farmer/Annie Ross vocalese number, its big range requiring flips into falsetto".

The ballad "Again" was sung by Ida Lupino in the 1948 film Road House, a favorite of Murphy. He performed it often live during this period of his career. Several of Michael Franks' tunes were recorded by Murphy, here he includes "Don't be Blue". Herbie Hancock's "Sly" from his 1973 album Head Hunters is included. ‘‘I like Sly. It’s a rock thing and yet keeps the line in the Lp in all these lyrics; it gives a kaleidoscope of my interests. I’m pleased with my words for Herbie Hancock’s music,’’ Murphy explained in the liner notes. "Smith plays the lines and Jim Nichols plays his butt off underneath. His playing here is worth the price of the record! Smith plays great through the whole thing. In fact, everyone does. I was turned on to it all”.

"We'll Be Together Again" is a ballad Murphy had success with in his live performances. ‘‘I use a 12/8 feel on the drums on the ballads, allowing me to do it incredibly slow. Yet it doesn’t drag. You completely go with the word ‘slow’ or you go with the word ‘fast’. There is nothing in between—there isn't kind of slow or kind of fast. Hey, just listen to the words. . . it's all there.’’ "Like a Lover (O Cantador)" is a ballad that caught Murphy's attention after hearing Flora Purim sing it. Murphy had an affinity for Brazilian jazz music, often including Brazilian songs on his albums and often sung in Portuguese. He would devote two complete albums to the music, Brazil Song (Cancões Do Brasil) (1983, Muse) and Night Mood: The Music of Ivan Lins (1987, Milestone).

Professional ratings
Review scores
Source	Rating
The Rolling Stone Jazz & Blues Album Guide	4/5 stars
The Virgin Encyclopedia of Popular Music	3/5 stars
AllMusic	4/5 stars
MusicHound Jazz	4.5/5 stars

== Reception ==
The Rolling Stone Jazz & Blues Album Guide assigns the album 4 stars (meaning, excellent: Four-star albums represent peak performances in an artist's career. Generally speaking, albums that are granted four or more stars constitute the best introductions to an artist's work for listeners who are curious).

The Virgin Encyclopedia of Popular Music gives the album 3 stars (meaning, good, by the artist's usual standards and therefore recommended.)

The AllMusic guide assigns 4 stars. Scott Yanow writes, "One of singer Mark Murphy's most famous records, this album finds him at the peak of his powers. This version of the title cut is considered a classic... Essential music". He singles out "Farmer's Market," Jobim's "Waters of March" and "Like a Lover". In his own book The Jazz Singers: The Ultimate Guide, Yanow lists the album as one of the best individual Muse sets, and writes of Murphy, "A brilliant vocal innovator, Mark Murphy can turn a song inside out in his improvisations, jumping between falsetto and low bass notes, or he can treat a ballad with real sensitivity. Based in the bebop tradition, Murphy (like Betty Carter) came up with his own individual way of extending the music. He has also been a highly influential vocal teacher and a lyricist who has written words to the songs".

Musichound Jazz: The Essential Album Guide assigns 4.5 bones (that is, four stars).

Peter Reilly reviewing Stolen Moments for Stereo Review (June 1979) said the album "is one of the freshest, most imaginative, and most expertly entertaining albums of the year". He wrote about Murphy, "No matter what the material, Murphy has the sure touch of a man who knows instinctively what artistic results he wants to achieve". Reilly credits the supporting musicians, "in particular Richie Cole, whose alto sax is almost Murphy's co-star here".

Murphy biographer Peter Jones includes the album in his list of top 10 essential Mark Murphy albums. He also listed "Farmer's Market" (track 3) as part of his article10 tracks by Mark Murphy I Can’t Do Without… in the London Jazz News series "10 Tracks I Can't Do Without".

== Track listing ==
1. "Stolen Moments" (Oliver Nelson, Mark Murphy) – 5:47
2. "Again" (Lionel Newman, Dorcas Cochran) – 3:31
3. "Farmer's Market" (Art Farmer, Annie Ross) – 2:54
4. "D.C. Farewell" (Richie Cole) – 2:59
5. "Waters of March" (Antônio Carlos Jobim) – 3:45
6. "Sly" (Herbert J. Hancock, Murphy) – 4:15
7. "We'll Be Together Again" (Carl T. Fischer, Frankie Laine) – 3:40
8. "Don't be Blue" (Michael Franks, John Guerin) – 3:39
9. "Like a Lover (O Cantador)" (Dori Caymmi, Nelson Motta) – 5:39

== Personnel ==
Performance

- Mark Murphy – vocals
- Mitch Farber – arranger
- Chuck Metcalf – bass (tracks 1, 3, 5, 6, 8, 9)
- Paul Breslin – bass (tracks 2, 4, 7)
- Vince Lateano – drums
- Smith Dobson – piano
- Richie Cole – alto saxophone
- Jim Nichols – guitar
- Jack Gobbetti – percussion
- Mark Levine – trombone
- Warren Gale – trumpet

Production

- Bob Enochs – engineer, recorded at Filmways / Wally Heider Studio, San Francisco June 1, 1978
- Elvin Campbell – engineer, mixer, mixed at CI Recording, New York City
- Mitch Farber – producer
- Clarence Eastmond – cover photography
- Ron Warwell – cover design
- Lupe De Leon – production coordinator
- Herb Wong – liner notes
