= Kerouac, Then and Now =

Studio album by Mark Murphy
- Released: 1989
- Recorded: November 1986
- Studios: Hillside Sound Studio, Englewood, New Jersey
- Genre: Vocal jazz
- Label: Muse
- Producer: Bill Mays

Mark Murphy chronology
| September Ballads (1988) | Kerouac, Then and Now (1989) | What a Way to Go (1990) |

Kerouac, Then and Now is a 1989 studio album by Mark Murphy.

Kerouac, Then and Now is the 25th recorded album by American jazz vocalist Mark Murphy. It was recorded when Murphy was 54 years old but not released by Muse in the United States until 1989 when Murphy was 57. The release is a tribute to Beat writer Jack Kerouac and bebop. Murphy reads excerpts from two of Kerouac's works, Big Sur (track 4) and On the Road (track 7) and performs a Lord Buckley comedic routine (track 8).

Mark Murphy recorded Kerouac, Then and Now in two days in November 1986 with producer and arranger Bill Mays. The album is a sequel to Bop for Kerouac from 1981. As with Bop for Kerouac, the album reflects Murphy's interest in the hip Beat Generation, Jack Kerouac, bebop, vocalese, mixing storytelling with music, ballads, and using the voice as a musical instrument for improvisation. Death is also a prominent theme throughout. Both albums were met with critical acclaim and Murphy was at his peak. Murphy wrote original lyrics for "November in the Snow" (track 7). As was typical with his Muse releases, he was paid a flat fee upfront and received no royalties. Kerouac Then and Now was not released for two and a half years after recording, during a period when Murphy was grief-stricken over his dying life partner.

== Background ==
Murphy had previously successfully recorded bop and vocalese (words added to an instrumental soloist's improvisation) on the previous concept album dedicated to Jack Kerouac entitled Bop for Kerouac. Kerouac Then and Now was the planned sequel.

In his book, This is Hip: The Life of Mark Murphy, author Peter Jones writes that "Death haunts the entire album". The funereal "Blood Count" written by the dying Billy Strayhorn, an elegy for Eddie Jefferson, the other ballads, the near death Kerouac car ride, and even the comedic take on Julius Caesar's eulogy all use death as one of its themes.

Speaking about his favorite personal recordings with Ted Pankin years later in an interview for Jazziz magazine, Murphy said, "We accomplished some rather remarkable things with Bop for Kerouac and the second Kerouac record. I was really responsible, I think, for bringing the Kerouac name back into the fore, because two years after my record came out, I noticed that the records started putting out Beat Generation stuff. Hmm! I was never given any credit for it, but anyway, that was my thought on it".

Dan Ouellette, writing in a feature in DownBeat in 1997 singles out for praise Murphy's "bold Kerouac projects" in which Murphy "unleashed a dazzling display of rambling, hip-daddy-o, stream-of-consciousness vocalese ... What started out as an experiment in capturing Kerouac’s spirit of wordplay turned into some of Murphy’s most organic, inspirational and spur-of-the- moment material". Murphy told Quellette, "Basically I was looking for another way to do a bebop album. I never met Jack, and I never expected I’d become a Kerouacian, but I am one of the lucky people still alive who did see Lord Buckley perform...What really turned me on about this guy [Kerouac] was that he wrote like an improvising musician...I really connected to him".

== Recording ==
In November 1986, Murphy and Bill Mays spent two days recording what they were calling Kerouac Revisited or Bop for Kerouac Part II at Tony Bennett's son's house (Antonia Bennett) in his Hillside Sound studio in Englewood, New Jersey. Initially Mays and Murphy were accompanied by Steve LaSpina on bass and Adam Nussbaum on drums and later, on the second day, with John Goldsby on bass. The studio had a Bosendorfer concert grand piano and separate isolation booths for each performer. But there was no video set-up and Murphy was in the hallway with a microphone. Bill Mays recounts the experience as disconcerting. Tracks 5, 6 and 9 were completed on the first day.

On the second day Murphy's sister was present for her first experience at one of Mark's recording sessions. Also present was a writer from the fan club magazine Mark's Times, who wrote later that Murphy and his crew got a perfect take on Billy Strayhorn's final song, the "exquisite" "Blood Count", "a ballad to end all ballads". However, the engineer wasn't recording, so it had to be redone. Strayhorn had written the tune while dying in the hospital and Mark sang recently added lyrics by M.B. Stillman. Mays arranged the tune as a "mini-epic" with Murphy's vocals exuding "a whiff of mortality". Mays said, "Mark wanted it to be like a funeral". There were also technical problems getting a successful take on Murphy's spoken word "San Francisco Ride" reading from Kerouac over bass and drum accompaniment.

Richie Cole wrote the elegy to Eddie Jefferson. Speaking about Murphy's recording of his song, he said, "It's hard to sing, man, with really large intervals. Mark nailed it". Bill Mays recounts how Murphy was inspired by "September in the Rain" to write "November in the Snow". Murphy wrote the lyrics first and then Mays composed the melody. Mays arranged it with overdubbed vibraphone in unison with piano to get "The Shearing Sound" (In his quintet of the 1950s and 1960s, George Shearing was known for a five voice piano technique with the top voice doubled by vibraphone and the bottom voice doubled by guitar, creating a signature sound), and then in the middle of the track Murphy reads a scene from On the Road in which the main characters are listening to George Shearing play at a Chicago nightclub.

Unable to afford a string section, Bill Mays used a synthesizer to achieve the sound Murphy wanted in the final ballad medley, as well as in "Blood Count", "Eddie Jefferson", and "Lazy Afternoon". Murphy wrote the liner notes extolling Kerouac, the Beat Generation, and the pop and bop music of those times, explaining how his feelings and treatment of the music had changed over the decades and discussing the legacy of the Beat Generation. And he acknowledged Peggy Lee, one of his biggest musical influences, as the inspiration for the albums title. Murphy wrote, "That's why | call this record “KEROUAC, THEN AND NOW“, because, as Peggy Lee wrote— “then was then, but now is now...”. (Lee wrote the lyrics to the Cy Coleman tune "Then Was Then (And Now Is Now)"). Kerouac, Then and Now would not be released for another two and a half years. By that time Murphy was consumed with grief over his dying partner Eddie O'Sullivan.

== Reception ==
Professional ratings
Review scores
| Source | Rating |
|---|---|
| Virgin Encyclopedia of Popular Music | 3/5 stars |
| AllMusic | 4.5/5 stars |
| The Penguin Guide to Jazz | (3)/4 stars |
| Rolling Stone Jazz & Blues Album Guide | 3.5/5 stars |
| DownBeat | 4.5/5 stars |

Overall the critical reception to the album has been positive. Reviewers find the album to be a worthy sequel to Bop for Kerouac, one of Murphy's essential recordings. The album was another in Murphy's tradition as a bebop singer and further associated him with the Beat lifestyle and bebop music. Reviewers find the Kerouac readings to be expressively blended with their associated tunes, in a fashion similar to the analogous recordings on Bop for Kerouac. The ballads and the comedy are also praised uniformly.

Published reviews and discussions include the following:

In his book, A Biographical Guide to the Great Jazz and Pop Singers, author Will Friedwald says that the recording is "a worthy sequel" to Bop for Kerouac, "Murphy's most successful concept album" and finds the two sets "constitute a moving meditation" on literary and musical beatnikism. He singles out the ballads and prose recitations as high points. He finds "The Night We Called It a Day" and "There's No You" to be among the best moments. But he calls the very highest points the Kerouac recitations, and "For supremely hip comedy, Murphy has memorized the most famous monologue by the greatest of all beat comics, the legendary Richard "Lord" Buckley, which translates Marc Antony's funeral oration from Julius Caesar into hep-cat lingo". He says the Kerouac pieces are possibly the most moving things Murphy has ever recorded.

The AllMusic entry written by Sott Yanow gives the album 4.5 stars saying, "It is Mark Murphy's narratives that make this set most unique and memorable". Yanow also includes the album in his list of best individual Muse sets by Mark Murphy in his book The Jazz Singers: The Ultimate Guide.

The Virgin Encyclopedia of Popular Music rates the release as good (3/5, meaning by the artist's usual standards and therefore recommended).

The Penguin Guide to Jazz assigns 3 stars (meaning a good if middleweight set; one that lacks the stature or consistency of the finest records, but which is certainly rewarding on its own terms).

John Swenson, in The Rolling Stone Jazz & Blues Album Guide, assigns the album 3.5 stars (good to excellent) and singles out the Lord Buckley comedic routine and the Kerouac readings.

Phyl Garland writing a 1990 review of the album in Stereo Review calls the album "superb," finding it to be a worthy successor to Bop for Kerouac. He says of "Blood Count", "What makes Murphy's interpretation so unforgettable is his way of seizing, bending, and shaping the notes into haunting, shadowy forms". He calls the performances "rousing", "memorable", and says, "Torch songs don't come any better than these...When the tumult subsides, as it eventually must, Murphy will be considered one of the major artists of our age".

Fred Bouchard, writing in DownBeat magazine in 1990, calls Murphy "restless, brilliant, irreverent, fun" playing "fast and loose with the easy beat (read: bop) spirit that Kerouac personified". He gives the album a 4.5 star rating, singling out the reading of Kerouac's mad cap car ride from Big Sur, and the Lord Buckley parody of Mark Antony's eulogy from Julius Caesar. Finding the ballads the most praiseworthy tracks, he calls the recordings of "Blood Count" and the Eddie Jefferson tribute "heart-wrenching". And finds the medley of "The Night We Called it a Day" and "There's No You" to be "breathtaking".

Author, singer, musician, composer, and Murphy biographer Peter Jones writes, "Murphy's second tribute to Jack Kerouac was one of his best ever albums". He calls the second tribute to Kerouac "perfectly realised and performed by all concerned, particularly Bill Mays" and singles out "Blood Count" and the medley of "The Night We Called It A Day" and "There's No You".

In a 1990 Washington Post review, Mike Joyce wrote Murphy's "handsome voice is a horn unto itself, limber and lively as you please. Some of Murphy's best moments, however, come when the mood and tempo downshifts for the wry, conversational lyric Ben Sidran composed for Thelonious Monk's "Ask Me Now," or for the restless, rain-soaked version of "Lazy Afternoon," or for Billy Strayhorn's gorgeous "Blood Count." In the end, it's those performances, not the Beat-era recitations, that are most likely to keep you coming back to this record again and again."

== Track listing ==
1. "Blood Count" (Billy Strayhorn, M.B. Stillman) – 5:00
2. "Medley: Eddie Jefferson / Take the "A" Train" (Richie Cole / Strayhorn, Joya Sherrill) – 8:24
3. "Ask Me Now" (Thelonious Monk, Ben Sidran) – 3:42
4. "San Francisco" – 2:15
  - Reading from Big Sur by Jack Kerouac with rhythm accompaniment
5. "Lazy Afternoon" (Jerome Moross, John Latouche) – 4:59
6. "If You Could See Me Now" (Tadd Dameron, Carl Sigman) – 6:51
7. "November in the Snow" (Bill Mays, Mark Murphy) – 5:04
  - Reading from On the Road by Jack Kerouac
8. "Lord Buckley" (Mays) – 3:17
  - Recitation of Lord Buckley's comedic routine with rhythm accompaniment
9. "Medley: The Night We Called It a Day / There's No You" (Matt Dennis, Tom Adair / Hal Hopper, Adair) – 7:39

== Personnel ==
Performance

- Mark Murphy – vocals
- John Goldsby – bass (tracks 1,4,8)
- Steve LaSpina – bass (tracks 2,3,5,6,7,9)
- Adam Nussbaum – drums
- Bill Mays – keyboards, arranger

Production

- Tim Geelan – engineer
- Bill Mays – producer
- Dick Smith – art direction
- Joe Brescio – mastering
- Richard Laird – photography
- Mark Murphy – liner notes
