= Bridging a Gap =

Studio album by Mark Murphy
- Released: 1973
- Recorded: November 20 & 21, 1972
- Genre: Jazz
- Length: 36:27
- Label: Muse; MR 5009
- Producer: Helen Keane, David Matthews

Mark Murphy chronology
This Must Be Earth (1969)	Bridging a Gap (1973)	Mark II (1974)

Bridging a Gap is an album by vocalist Mark Murphy which was recorded in 1972 and released on the Muse label.

== Reception ==
Professional ratings
Review scores
Source	Rating
AllMusic	4/5 stars
DownBeat	4/5 stars

The AllMusic review by Ron Wynn stated: "The celebrated bop, ballads, standards, and scat vocalist sings with customary verve, clarity, and confidence, backed by a combo featuring Mike and Randy Brecker, Ron Carter, and more."

Reviewing for DownBeat, Robert Rusch assigned the album 4 stars. Rusch stated: "Good music, enjoyable, fine singing, but with the lack of good male jazz vocal records, why bridge a gap between jazz and pop, especially when this is constantly being done and over done"? He said Murphy was "Unknown, unrecognized, yet for those who have seen him 'in person,' I feel unforgettable".

== Track listing ==
All compositions by Mark Murphy except where noted

1. "Come and Get Me" – 3:37
2. "Sausalito" – 3:42
3. "She's Gone" – 2:50
4. "Steamroller" (James Taylor) – 3:14
5. "We Could Be Flying" (Michel Colombier) – 3:39
6. "Sunday in New York" (Peter Nero, Carroll Coates) – 5:08
7. "Gee, Baby, Ain't I Good to You" (Andy Razaf, Don Redman) – 3:01
8. "No More" (Tutti Camarata, Bob Russell) – 3:12
9. "As Time Goes By" (Herman Hupfeld) – 3:01
10. "I'm Glad There Is You" (Jimmy Dorsey, Paul Mertz) – 5:03

== Personnel ==
- Mark Murphy – vocals
- Randy Brecker – trumpet
- Michael Brecker – tenor saxophone
- Sam Brown – guitar
- Pat Rebillot – piano, organ
- Ron Carter – bass
- Jimmy Madison (tracks 1 & 3–5) – drums, percussion
