= Mark Murphy Sings =

Studio album by Mark Murphy
- Released: 1975
- Recorded: June 17–19, 1975
- Genre: Vocal jazz
- Length: 38:13
- Label: Muse
- Producer: Helen Keane

Mark Murphy chronology
Mark 2 (1975)	Mark Murphy Sings (1975)	Mark Murphy Sings Mostly Dorothy Fields & Cy Coleman (1977)

Mark Murphy Sings is a 1975 studio album by Mark Murphy.

== Background ==
Jon Hendricks wrote lyrics to John Coltrane's "Naima" (Tell Me the Truth, Arista, 1975). But for this release Murphy uses his own new lyrics. Producer, broadcaster Michael Bourne wrote, "He envisioned the song as a ceremonial incantation". Murphy said, "Did you ever read that Tom Tryon book about the village? It's all about this group of Cornish people who emigrated to America around 1650 and holed up in this little Connecticut village where time just passed them by. Nobody knows they're here, and they simply never veered from the worship of the Earth Mother. That's what I thought of doing the song. The end refrain goes 'Naima, timeless name for a timeless woman.' It's like the very first earth goddess, the very first religion."

== Reception ==
Professional ratings
Review scores
Source	Rating
AllMusic	4.5/5 stars
The Rolling Stone Jazz Record Guide	3/5 stars
DownBeat	4/5 stars

The AllMusic review by Scott Yanow said that "This CD reissue brings back one of singer Mark Murphy's best all-round sessions...Murphy is heard throughout in prime form, constantly stretching himself"

DownBeat assigned the album 4 stars. In his review Chuck Berg says Murphy has "an ability to cast evocative spells, a unique voice quality with distinctive raspy overtones, impeccable musicianship (his intonation and phrasing are virtually faultless), and a taste for challenging material and accomplished musicians". The review singles out "Naima", "Young and Foolish" and "Maiden Voyage" as highlights.

== Track listing ==
1. "On the Red Clay" (Freddie Hubbard, Murphy) – 4:35
2. "Naima" (John Coltrane) – 4:49
3. "Body and Soul" (Frank Eyton, Johnny Green, Edward Heyman, Robert Sour) – 5:15
4. "Young and Foolish" (Albert Hague, Arnold B. Horwitt) – 2:49
5. "Empty Faces" (Lani Hall, Milton Nascimento) – 5:15
6. "Maiden Voyage" (Herbie Hancock) – 5:26
7. "How Are You Dreaming?" (Bob Crewe, A. Shatkin) – 4:29
8. "Cantaloupe Island" (Hancock, Murphy) – 5:35

== Personnel ==
Performance

- Mark Murphy – vocals
- David Matthews – arranger
- Harvie S – double bass
- Jimmy Madison – drums
- Don Grolnick – fender rhodes, keyboards, organ, piano
- Joe Puma – guitar
- Sue Evans – percussion
- David Sanborn – alto saxophone
- Michael Brecker – tenor saxophone
- Randy Brecker – trumpet

Production

- Hal Wilson – art direction, illustrations
- Wieslaw Woszczyk – engineer, remixing
- Michael Bourne – liner notes, LP
- Dave Helland – liner notes, CD reissue
- Helen Keane – producer
