= The Best of Mark Murphy: The Capitol Years =

Compilation album by Mark Murphy
- Released: 1997
- Recorded: 1958–1960
- Genre: Vocal jazz
- Length: 49:00
- Label: Capitol Jazz
- Producer: James Gavin

The Best of Mark Murphy: The Capitol Years is a compilation of selected highlights of singer Mark Murphy's recordings for the Capitol Records label. It was released in 1997.

== Background ==
Capitol Records producer Tom Morgan signed Murphy to a three-album contract in 1958 on the basis of the 1956 and 1957 albums he recorded for Milt Gabler of Decca Records. Morgan and Murphy would produce three albums together from 1958 to 1960, This Could Be the Start of Something, Mark Murphy's Hip Parade, and Playing the Field. Murphy told Will Friedwald that he went to California "looking for places to work. Instead, to his surprise, instead of getting gigs, he got the chance to make the three albums for Capitol".

In the liner notes James Gavin tells how Murphy was staying at the YMCA, searching for work as a singer, when he got his second career break in 1958. Murphy said it was, "The year I was starving in Hollywood – literally. As soon as I signed the contract I went over to this cafeteria, just sliced that turkey, and ate an enormous meal." Gavin wrote, "Walking back to the Y, he fantasized about becoming the male version of his idol Peggy Lee, who combined pop stardom with an illustrious jazz reputation".

== Recording ==
Jazz musician and arranger Bill Holman was Murphy's personal choice for musical director and arranger for the albums. Murphy knew of him from his work with Stan Kenton, and he was a favorite of Peggy Lee, who Murphy idolized. Peggy Lee wrote the liner notes for Mark Murphy's Hip Parade where she described Murphy's vocal approach, "He phrases like a horn, and a horn with a modern sound". Bill Holman described Murphy's role in the arranging process in the liner notes to This Could Be the Start of Something, "First, being a good piano player, he went into the Capitol studios and recorded a demonstration of each tune the way he heard it, accompanying himself. Second, he knew the exact feeling he wanted on each section of each tune. For example, he was able to indicate where the conga drum should or should not be used to get the sound he wanted . . . equal arranging credit should go to him".

Producer Morgan and director Holman used many famous West Coast jazz musicians on the recordings. Pianist Jimmy Rowles appears on all three albums. He was a noted accompanist for singers such as Billie Holiday, Ella Fitzgerald, Jo Stafford, Anita O'Day, and Julie London. The rest of the rhythm section on these albums included bassist Joe Mondragon, and drummers Mel Lewis, Stan Levy, and Shelly Manne. All of them worked with Peggy Lee. The trumpeters and brothers Pete and Conte Candoli appeared on many of the recordings.

The albums include Murphy in trio settings, small jazz band settings, and with pop background vocals. He records some of his first scat solos, standards from the Great American Songbook, and recent pop hits that they attempt to make hip, as well as attempts at new hit singles.

James Gavin curated the selections for this release. Ellington's "I Didn't Know About You" was a song Murphy heard Nicky DeFrancis perform at "Jilly" Rizzo's 52nd street bar Jilly's Saloon. Murphy said, "He was fantastic – played like Erroll Garner and sang like the Italian singers in Philadelphia, where he was from. He did the hippest tunes in New York at that time, like "I Guess I'll Hang My Tears Out to Dry" and "I Didn't Know About You". If you asked for them, everyone knew you were hip. That's why they sometimes appeared in my records".

One of Capitol Records founders, Buddy DeSylva, is covered with his "Wishing (Will Make It So)" which is from 1939's Love Affair co-starring Charles Boyer and Irene Dunne. A Murphy favorite, "Put the Blame on Mame" is a song featured in the 1946 film noir Gilda in which Rita Hayworth lip synched to Anita Ellis' vocal recording. Murphy adds a few original lines. Murphy and Producer Tom Morgan thought it had potential to be a hit single but Capitol refused to release and promote it as a single. Murphy said, "By that time they had given up on me. They released the album and said Goodbye".

The Best of the Capitol Years also features "The Blacksmith Blues" which was never released by Capitol until now. The tune was a hit for Ella Mae Morse. The song "This Could Be the Start of Something" by Steve Allen was a minor hit for Murphy. But album sales were weak, critical reception was tepid and the reviews were mixed. Murphy said, "I had tried to compromise, which of course was a mistake. People who wanted those songs didn't want to hear me, and people who liked me didn't want to hear those songs . . . We were kind of traumatized." "I'm an alternative singer. In those days we didn't know what to call it", Murphy told Gavin.

Murphy's biographer Peter Jones points out that Murphy had grown up and matured with bebop and swing, but he was now trying to achieve stardom in the mainstream commercial record market. "That seemed to mean presenting himself as a young hipster, a swinging cool dude around town, toying with the affections of innumerable women, and having a whale of a time". Jones wrote, "The one thing Murphy hadn't yet tried was just being himself". Although none of his Capitol records were as commercially successful as Murphy and his label had hoped, they marked the beginning of a long, interesting and influential career. Although he never became a star, he would become a highly respected performer noted for his fearlessness and an influential vocal coach. Just before this compilation came out Murphy won the 1996 DownBeat annual reader's poll for best male jazz singer and would win again in 1997. Murphy would next move to Riverside with his first release for that label in 1961.

== Reception ==
Professional ratings
Review scores
Source	Rating
AllMusic	4.5/5 stars

The editors of AllMusic assigns the release 4.5 stars and in its review by Stephen Thomas Erlewine, he writes that the album is "an excellent overview of the three albums Murphy recorded for Capitol in the late '50s that proves he was one of the more underrated singers of his era. Murphy is an inventive vocalist, putting new spins on songs".

Scott Yanow recommends the release in his book The Jazz Singers: The Ultimate Guide. He writes, "The Best Of Mark Murphy has the high points from his three Capitol records, including a popular version of Steve Allen's "This Could Be The Start Of Something Big".

Will Friedwald said that the taken together albums made during his early recording career from 1956 to 1960 "reveal a young singer with a strong, dark, attractive voice, with a lot of good ideas and an obvious commitment to the jazz idiom-but one who stops just short of having a sound and a style of his own". Friedwald wrote, "As Murphy himself noted, the audience for these songs just wasn't his, and vice versa-even though he succeeded in doing something aesthetically interesting and indeed hip with material that no one would have thought could lend itself to such a treatment".

== Track listing ==
No.	Title	Lyrics	Music	Album	Length
1.	"Put the Blame on Mame"	Allan Roberts, Doris Fisher	Roberts, Fisher	Playing the Field	2:49
2.	"Swinging on a Star"	Johnny Burke	Jimmy Van Heusen	Playing the Field	2:36
3.	"Playing the Field"	Steve Allen	Allen	Playing the Field	2:46
4.	"Day In – Day Out"	Johnny Mercer	Rube Bloom	This Could Be the Start of Something	3:55
5.	"This Could Be the Start of Something"	Allen	Allen	This Could Be the Start of Something (album)	3:40
6.	"I Didn't Know About You"	Bob Russell	Duke Ellington	Playing the Field	3:19
7.	"The Blacksmith Blues"	Jack Holmes	Holmes	New issue from 1959	2:09
8.	"Kansas City"	Jerry Leiber, Mike Stoller	Leiber, Stoller	Playing the Field	2:42
9.	"Wishing (Will Make It So)"	Buddy DeSylva	DeSylva	Playing the Field	3:17
10.	"As Long as I Live"	Ted Koehler	Harold Arlen	Playing the Field	1:46
11.	"Witchcraft"	Carolyn Leigh	Cy Coleman	Mark Murphy's Hip Parade	3:35
12.	"I Only Have Eyes for You"	Al Dubin	Harry Warren	Mark Murphy's Hip Parade	3:02
13.	"That Old Black Magic"	Mercer	Arlen	This Could Be the Start of Something	2:09
14.	"Cheek to Cheek"	Irving Berlin	Berlin	This Could Be the Start of Something	3:15
15.	"Jersey Bounce"	Buddy Feyne	Tiny Bradshaw, Eddie Johnson, Bobby Plater	This Could Be the Start of Something	1:52
16.	"Sweet Georgia Brown"	Ben Bernie, Kenneth Casey, Maceo Pinkard	Bernie, Casey, Pinkard	This Could Be the Start of Something	2:30
17.	"Lucky in Love"	DeSylva, Lew Brown	Ray Henderson	This Could Be the Start of Something	1:00
18.	"Hit the Road to Dreamland"	Mercer	Arlen	This Could Be the Start of Something	2:41
Total length:					49:00

== Personnel ==
James Gavin – producer
