= Mark Murphy Sings Nat's Choice The Complete Nat "King" Cole Songbook Volumes 1 and 2 =

1986 compilation album by Mark Murphy

Compilation album by Mark Murphy
- Released: 1986
- Recorded: 1983
- Studio: Western Sound Studios, Kalamazoo, Michigan and Sage & Sound Studio, Hollywood, California
- Genre: Vocal jazz
- Length: 1:07:37
- Label: Muse
- Producer: Mark Murphy and Steve Zegree

Mark Murphy chronology
Beauty and the Beast (1986)	Mark Murphy Sings Nat's Choice The Complete Nat "King" Cole Songbook Volumes 1 and 2 (1986)	Night Mood: The Music of Ivan Lins (1987)

Mark Murphy Sings Nat's Choice The Complete Nat "King" Cole Songbook Volumes 1 and 2 is a 1986 studio compilation album by Mark Murphy.

Mark Murphy Sings Nat's Choice The Complete Nat "King" Cole Songbook Volumes 1 and 2 is a compilation of two Muse Records studio albums by American jazz vocalist Mark Murphy; namely, Mark Murphy Sings the Nat King Cole Songbook, Volume One and Mark Murphy Sings Nat's Choice: The Nat King Cole Songbook, Volume Two. It was released by the Muse label in the United States in 1986, the year following the releases of the separate volumes. This album is a collection of songs associated with Nat King Cole. Murphy received his third Grammy Award nomination for his performance. Mark Murphy released several tribute albums during his career including Memories of You for Joe Williams, Bop for Miles for Miles Davis, Bop for Kerouac and Kerouac, Then and Now for Jack Kerouac, Night Moods for Ivan Lins, The Latin Porter for Cole Porter, and What a Way to Go dedicated to Sammy Davis Jr.

== Background ==
In 1983 Murphy decided to record a tribute album to his teenage idol Nat King Cole. Murphy said, "Everybody else was a Sinatra freak, but I was a Nat King Cole freak...He was like rhythmic honey". Murphy said that Cole delivered, "the loosest, slipperiest vocals in the world". Murphy wrote in the liner notes to Vol.1, "This Nat King Cole Songbook is dedicated to his daughter Natalie and brother Freddie - two fabulous singers - but mostly to the memory of Nat's A&R man at Capitol Records, Lee Gillette. Lee was also a founding member of NARAS".

In an interview with John Watson for the BBC Murphy said, “My uncle - my mother's brother - introduced me to the music of Art Tatum in around 1937 or 38, and so I started riding down across the park to listen to the rest of his jazz records. He had a lot of Benny Goodman, and I had very early introductions to Peggy Lee, Stan Kenton, June Christy . . . and Nat "King" Cole was truly my king in those days, you know.”

== Recording ==
The tracks were recorded in two sessions in October and November of 1983 with Murphy and Steve Zegree producing. Each tune is recorded as a duet with a single instrument, either bass, piano or guitar. Murphy was attracted to the challenge of having his voice so very exposed in this rather stark approach to the songs. Michael Bourne wrote in the liner notes, "Murphy's voice, always a spectacular instrument in itself, is called upon to be even more virtuosic than ever". Murphy said the recording was a tribute, not a copy, "to my first influence, and to Nat's taste. Of course he could make everything sound good, but he also picked such wonderful songs". Murphy decided to include many lesser known songs associated with Cole, and avoided many of his bigger hits.

Bob Magnusson, who appeared with Murphy on Bop for Kerouac, accompanies on bass on three tracks (1,6,16). And Murphy is accompanied by guitarist Joseph LoDuca on seven tracks (2, 4, 7, 12–14, 17). The pianist and guitarist had not previously recorded with Murphy. Gary Schunk accompanies on piano on seven tracks (3, 5, 8–11, 15).

Two tracks, one from each original volume, did not make it on this compilation: "Until the Real Thing Comes Along / Baby, Baby All the Time" (Sammy Cahn, Saul Chaplin, L.E. Freeman, Mann Holiner, Alberta Nichols / Bobby Troup) which is track 8 on volume 1 and "Walkin' My Baby Back Home / Breezin' Along With the Breeze" (Fred Ahlert, Roy Turk / Haven Gillespie, Seymour Simons, Richard A. Whiting) which is track 3 on volume 2.

== Reception ==
Professional ratings
Review scores
Source	Rating
The Virgin Encyclopedia of Popular Music	3/5 stars
AllMusic Guide to Jazz	4/5 stars

Scott Yanow assigns 4 stars to Vol. 1 and 3 stars to Vol. 2 in the AllMusic Guide to Jazz. He said, "It would have been nice if all of the musicians could have played together a bit, but the strong material and Murphy's interpretive skills hold one's interest throughout...Murphy mostly avoided the obvious hits, opting for particularly strong material that fits his chance-taking style". Yanow calls the combined release of Vol.1 and Vol 2. "excellent" in his book The Jazz Singers: The Ultimate Guide.

Colin Larkin assigns 3 stars to the album in The Virgin Encyclopedia of Popular Music. (3 stars means, "Good: a record of average worth, but one that might possess considerable appeal for fans of a particular style").

Murphy biographer Peter Jones singles out "These Foolish Things" as "one of the most affecting songs on the album", and said the recordings for Vol 2. were "more accessible" than Vol 1.

Murphy was nominated for a Grammy award for Best Jazz Vocal Performance, Male at the 28th Annual Grammy Awards for his performance on Mark Murphy Sings Nat's Choice - The Nat "King" Cole Songbook Volume I. He lost to Bobby McFerrin and Jon Hendricks for Another Night in Tunisia.

== Track listing ==
1. "Nature Boy / Calypso Blues" (Eden Ahbez / Nat King Cole, Don George) – 5:56
2. "Love Letters / Serenata" (Victor Young, Edward Heyman / Leroy Anderson, Mitchell Parish) – 3:39
3. "Oh You Crazy Moon" (Jimmy Van Heusen, Johnny Burke) – 3:38
4. "’Tis Autumn" (Henry Nemo) – 4:13
5. "I Keep Goin’ Back To Joe's" (Marvin Fisher, Jack Segal) – 4:18
6. "Tangerine" (Victor Schertzinger, Johnny Mercer) – 3:50
7. "Lush Life" (Billy Strayhorn) – 4:22
8. "Never Let Me Go" (Jay Livingston, Ray Evans) – 3:32
9. "These Foolish Things" (Jack Strachey, Harry Link, Holt Marvell) – 4:17
10. "Portrait of Jennie / Ruby" (J. Russel Robinson, Gordon Burdge / Heinz Roemheld, Mitchell Parish) – 5:01
11. "For All We Know" (J. Fred Coots, Sam M. Lewis) – 3:32
12. "Maybe You’ll Be There" (Rube Bloom, Sammy Gallop) – 4:41
13. "Blue Gardenia" (Lester Lee, Bob Russell) – 3:04
14. "Don’t Let Your Eyes Go Shopping" (Billy Austin, Sheldon Smith) – 4:12
15. "More Than You Know" (Vincent Youmans, Edward Eliscu, Billy Rose) – 3:40
16. "Look Out for Love" (Danny Meehan, Colin Romoff) – 2:15
17. "The End of a Love Affair" (Billy Sherrill) – 3:27

== Personnel ==
Performance

- Mark Murphy – vocals
- Bob Magnusson – bass (tracks 1, 6, 16)
- Gary Schunk – piano (tracks 3, 5, 8–11, 15)
- Joseph LoDuca – guitar (tracks 2, 4, 7, 12, 13, 14, 17)

Production

- Jim Mooney – engineer, (tracks 1, 6, 16) at Sage & Sound Studio, Hollywood, California November 1, 1983
- Dean Lathrop – engineer, (except 1, 6, 16) at Western Sound Studios, Kalamazoo, Michigan October 8–10, 1983
- Mark Murphy – producer
- Steve Zegree – producer
- Dick Smith – art direction
- Michael Bourne – liner notes
- Neil Tesser – liner notes
- Joe Brescio – mastering at The Cutting Room, New York City
- Marty Paich – orchestrator (track 10)
