= Memories of You: Remembering Joe Williams =

2003 studio album by Mark Murphy

Studio album by Mark Murphy
- Released: 2003
- Recorded: February 4, 2003
- Studio: The Studio, NYC
- Genre: Vocal jazz
- Length: 53:00
- Label: HighNote Records
- Producer: Norman Simmons

Mark Murphy chronology
Lucky to Be Me (2001)	Memories of You: Remembering Joe Williams (2003)	Bop for Miles (2004)

Memories of You: Remembering Joe Williams is a 2003 studio album by Mark Murphy.

Memories of You is the 41st recorded album by American jazz vocalist Mark Murphy. It was recorded when Murphy was about to turn 71 years old and released by HighNote Records in the United States in 2003. The release is a collection of blues in tribute to Joe Williams, and includes many of his hits and the standards associated with him. Norman Simmons, who worked closely with Williams, was the producer, arranger and pianist for the album. Murphy recorded the tunes in The Studio, NYC.

== Background ==
Peter Jones in the biography This is Hip: The Life of Mark Murphy, relates that Murphy had wanted to do a tribute to Joe Williams for a long time. In this collection Murphy is relaxed, and sings the old-style material simply, avoiding inappropriate extravagance with no need to be hip or experimental. Producer and pianist Norman Simmons had recorded five albums with Joe Williams in the 80s and 90s and selected possible tunes for Murphy to consider and did the arrangements. Murphy felt an affinity with Williams, Basie, and the urban blues and he had his own roots in the Swing Era. Murphy recalls Williams grinning at him from the wings during a show at Kent State University in Ohio, and "Ever since then, his blues picked me up more times than I can remember".

== Recording ==
Mark Murphy recorded the tracks in one day, February 4, 2003. Producer Norman Simmons arranged the tunes and also plays piano. They are accompanied by Bill Easley on tenor and soprano saxophone, Daryl Hall on bass (ninth annual Thelonious Monk International Jazz Competition winner), Paul Bollenbeck on guitar and Grady Tate on drums. In the liner notes Murphy says, "A very mellow recording experience, I must say. On this I wanted everything to be copasetic and organic, like the stuff I grew up with. That's a departure. For the last few years I've been bringing in stuff that was new to me, because I liked it or had written it and so on."

Professional ratings
Review scores
Source	Rating
The Penguin Guide to Jazz Recordings	3.5/4 stars

== Reception ==
In The Penguin Guide to Jazz Richard Cook assigns Memories Of You 4 qualified stars: ***(*), meaning an excellent record, with some exceptional music, only kept out of the front rank by some minor reservations. He says the album is a "Joe Williams tribute (with Joe's old pianist Norman Simmons on hand) which suits him splendidly, the rocking Williams swing and big, hearty emoting resting comfortably on Murphy's shoulders. The voice may have frayed a little, but the mastery is absolutely intact".

Biographer Peter Jones calls the recording one of a trilogy of late career masterpieces, alongside Once to Every Heart and Love is What Stays. Joel Roberts says, "Murphy delivers a master class in jazz singing and one of the best albums of his career". Scott Yanow includes the album in his list of "other worthy recordings of the last twenty years" by Mark Murphy in his book The Jazz Singers: The Ultimate Guide.

Zan Stewart in a JazzTimes article from December 2003 said, the "two slow ballads lie at the heart of the album: the last cut, "A Man Ain't Supposed to Cry", which had been recorded by Williams during an early '60s date for Roulette Records, and the title track, which Murphy builds with rhythmic ebbs and flows, the swallowed words and bent notes that make him so special". Stewart comments that both Murphy and Williams "had a way of making the words and the melody felt and believed...Murphy recalls being moved during a show at Kent State University in Ohio, when Williams had grinned at him from the wings...'I'm not considered a blues singer', admits Murphy, 'but I do love to sing the blues'. These two tracks ["Everyday" and "The Comeback"] prove it."

Christopher Louden praised the album in his JazzTimes review. He wrote, "Mark Murphy is the Rolls Royce of jazz interpreters. His bruised magnificence setting the platinum standard for all comers". He called the album "a richly variegated salute to Joe Williams". He singled out his interpretations of “A Man Ain’t Supposed to Cry”, “Love You Madly”, “Just Squeeze Me”, “Close Enough for Love”, and “I Got It Bad (And That Ain’t Good)”.

== Track listing ==
1. "The Comeback" (Charles Frazier, Memphis Slim) – 5:22
2. "In the Evenin'" (Leroy Carr, Don Raye) – 6:38
3. "Everyday" (Memphis Slim) – 5:03
4. "Memories of You" (Eubie Blake, Andy Razaf) – 5:59
5. "Just Squeeze Me " (Duke Ellington, Lee Gaines) – 4:30
6. "If I Were a Bell" (Frank Loesser) – 3:07
7. "Close Enough for Love" (Johnny Mandel, Paul Williams) – 4:35
8. "Love You Madly" (Ellington) – 3:24
9. "I Got It Bad (and That Ain't Good)" (Ellington, Paul Francis Webster) – 5:21
10. "Supposin'" (Paul Denniker, Razaf) – 3:05
11. "A Man Ain't Supposed to Cry" (Norman Gimbel, Frankie Laine, Irving Reid) – 6:25

== Personnel ==
Performance

- Mark Murphy – vocals,
- Bill Easley – tenor saxophone, soprano saxophone
- Daryl Hall – bass
- Paul Bollenbeck – guitar
- Norman Simmons – piano, arranger
- Grady Tate – drums

Production

- Katherine Miller – engineer
- Norman Simmons – producer
- Joe Fields – executive producer
- Bob Barry – photography
- Keiji Obata – design
- Ted Panken – liner notes
