= Playing the Field (Mark Murphy album) =

Studio album by Mark Murphy
- Released: 1960
- Recorded: 1960
- Studio: Capitol Studios
- Genre: Vocal jazz
- Length: 32:44
- Label: Capitol Records
- Producer: Tom Morgan

Mark Murphy chronology
Mark Murphy's Hip Parade (1960)	Playing the Field (1960)	Rah (1961)

Playing the Field is a studio album by Mark Murphy.

Playing the Field is the fifth album by American jazz vocalist Mark Murphy and his third for Capitol Records. It was recorded in 1960, when Murphy was 28 years old, and released by the Capitol Records label in the United States in 1960. The album is a collection of pop tunes and standards performed with a jazz band.

== Background ==
Capitol Records producer Tom Morgan signed Murphy to a three-album contract when Murphy was on the West Coast in 1958 on the basis of the two albums he recorded for Milt Gabler of Decca Records. This release was his final album for Capitol. Although none of his Capitol records were as commercially successful as Murphy and his label had hoped, they marked the beginning of a long, interesting and influential career.

== Recording ==
The arrangements for this release were done by Bill Holman. Holman had arranged his prior Capitol releases. The recordings are divided between small band and trio arrangements.

Pianist Jimmy Rowles returns for his final appearance with Murphy. He was an in-demand accompanist for singers such as Billie Holiday, Ella Fitzgerald, Jo Stafford, Anita O'Day, and Julie London. Rowles along with bassist Joe Mondragon and drummer Shelly Manne formed the rhythm section. The trumpeter Conte Candoli returned as well.

Ellington's "I Didn't Know About You" was a song Murphy heard Nicky DeFrancis perform at "Jilly" Rizzo's 52nd street bar Jilly's Saloon. Murphy said, "He was fantastic – played like Erroll Garner and sang like the Italian singers in Philadelphia, where he was from. He did the hippest tunes in New York at that time, like "I Guess I'll Hang My Tears Out to Dry" and "I Didn't Know About You". If you asked for them, everyone knew you were hip. That's why they sometimes appeared in my records".

Buddy DeSylva's "Wishing (Will Make It So)" is from 1939's Love Affair co-starring Charles Boyer and Irene Dunne. "Put the Blame on Mame" is a song featured in the 1946 film noir Gilda in which Rita Hayworth lip synched to Anita Ellis' vocal recording. Apparently it was a Murphy favorite and he adds a few original lines. Murphy and Producer Tom Morgan thought it had potential to be a hit single but Capitol declined to release and promote it as a single. Murphy said, "By that time they had given up on me. They released the album and said Goodbye".

== Reception ==
Professional ratings
Review scores
Source	Rating
The Virgin Encyclopedia of Popular Music	3/5 stars

Colin Larkin assigns the record 3 stars in The Virgin Encyclopedia of Popular Music. Three stars means, "Good. By the artist's usual standards and therefore recommended". He wrote, "the appearance of several albums in the late 50s announced that the jazz world had a new and important singer in its midst".

Murphy biographer Peter Jones says the album "was probably his worst to date, with several sub-two minute tracks, presumably in hopes of some easy radio play. The mood is relentlessly upbeat, but much of the material is forgettable, and there is too much insincere showbiz sparkle and showing off . . . From the laddish title to the cover, Murphy was again being sold as a babe-magnet-cum-man-about-town, depicted in various sophisticated poses with four different females." Jones points out that Murphy had grown up with bebop and swing, but was trying to achieve stardom in the mainstream commercial record market. "That seemed to mean presenting himself as a young hipster, a swinging cool dude around town, toying with the affections of innumerable women, and having a whale of a time". Jones wrote, "The one thing Murphy hadn't yet tried was just being himself".

Will Friedwald said that the albums made during this period from 1956 to 1960 "reveal a young singer with a strong, dark, attractive voice, with a lot of good ideas and an obvious commitment to the jazz idiom-but one who stops just short of having a sound and a style of his own". Friedwald wrote, "As Murphy himself noted, the audience for these songs just wasn't his, and vice versa-even though he succeeded in doing something aesthetically interesting and indeed hip with material that no one would have thought could lend itself to such a treatment".

== Track listing ==
1. "Put the Blame on Mame" (Allan Roberts, Doris Fisher) – 2:49
2. "Swinging on a Star" (Jimmy Van Heusen, Johnny Burke) – 2:36
3. "My Gal's Come Back" (Benny Goodman, Mel Powell, Ray McKinley) – 1:51
4. "Playing the Field" (Steve Allen) – 2:46
5. "Heart and Soul" (Hoagy Carmichael, Frank Loesser) – 2:39
6. "Love Is a Many-Splendored Thing" (Paul Francis Webster, Sammy Fain) – 1:53
7. "Honeysuckle Rose" (Andy Razaf, Fats Waller) – 3:08
8. "Isn't It About Time" (Teri Morin) – 2:08
9. "Wishing (Will Make It So)" (Buddy DeSylva) – 3:17
10. "As Long as I Live" (Harold Arlen, Ted Koehler) – 1:46
11. "I Didn't Know About You" (Duke Ellington, Bob Russell) – 3:19
12. "But Not for Me" (George Gershwin, Ira Gershwin) – 4:27

== Personnel ==
Performance

- Mark Murphy – vocals
- Bill Holman – arranger, conductor
- Joe Mondragon – bass
- Jimmy Rowles – piano
- Shelly Manne – drums
- Joe Maini, Al Thomson – alto saxophone
- Al Hendrickson – guitar
- Conte Candoli – trumpet
- Med Flory, Bill Perkins – tenor saxophone
- Stu Williamson, Al Porcino, Ray Triscari – trumpet
- Jack Nimitz – baritone saxophone
- Frank Rosolino, Lou McCreary, Bob Fitzpatrick – trombone

Production

- Unknown – engineer, recorded in Los Angeles, July 5 and 7, 1960
- Tom Morgan – producer
