= A Beautiful Friendship: Remembering Shirley Horn =

2012 EP by Mark Murphy

EP by Mark Murphy
- Released: June 12, 2013
- Recorded: November 2012
- Venue: Merion Inn, Cape May, New Jersey
- Genre: Vocal jazz
- Label: Gearbox Records
- Producer: Jean-Pierre Leduc, Darrel Sheinman

Mark Murphy chronology
Never Let Me Go (2010)	A Beautiful Friendship: Remembering Shirley Horn (2013)

A Beautiful Friendship: Remembering Shirley Horn is an EP by Mark Murphy.

A Beautiful Friendship: Remembering Shirley Horn is the 47th recording (EP) by American jazz vocalist Mark Murphy. It was recorded when Murphy was 80 years old in 2012 and released by the Gearbox label in the United States and the UK in 2013. This album is collection of standards associated with Shirley Horn. The recording is dedicated to Shirley Horn and pianist George Mesterhazy, Murphy's accompanist. This was Mark Murphy's final recording.

== Background ==
In the liner notes Christopher Loudon attributes the initial idea of a Shirley Horn tribute album to George Mesterhazy. Pianist and arranger Mesterhazy had worked with vocalists Rebecca Parris (Spring, My Foolish Heart), Paula West (Live at the Jazz Standard), Shirley Horn (May the Music Never End, Loving You) and Murphy. Speaking about Horn Murphy said, "I never knew her well but our paths would cross at festivals and clubs and it was always a pleasure to see and hear her. We liked each other, and I know she liked what I did. She even said to me once after a show, 'I thought I was good, and then I heard you.' Which is crazy, as I would never think that. It was her way of winking at me, the way like-minded artists communicate with each other, a way to let the other know one was a secret fan".

Meterhazy unexpectedly died before the recording began. Murphy and his manager Jean-Pierre Leduc were determined to record the project, now envisioned to be a tribute to Mesterhazy as well as Horn. The recording took place at the Merion Inn, Cape May, New Jersey, Mesterhazy's hometown. Mesterhazy had performed regularly at the inn which was owned by his long time companion Vicki Watson.

The chosen songs were all associated with Horn. Horn recorded Jimmy Van Heusen's "But Beautiful", from the film Road to Rio, Cole Porter's "Get Out of Town", from the musical Leave It to Me!, and "A Beautiful Friendship" on her album Close Enough for Love (Verve, 1988). Horn's recording of "Here's to Life" from Here's to Life (Verve, 1991) became her signature tune. She was nominated for a Grammy Award for Best Jazz Vocal Performance for "Here's to Life" at the 35th Annual Grammy Awards but lost to Bobby McFerrin for "Round Midnight" in the album Play. Her album reached number one on the Billboard jazz chart.

== Recording ==
The album was produced by Jean-Pierre Leduc, Murphy's manager, and Darrel Sheinman, from Gearbox Records. The recording took place near the time of the Cape May Exit Zero Jazz Festival during which Steve Williams, Shirley Horn's drummer of 25 years, and bassist Curtis Lundy were available. Murphy had also just performed at the festival. Curtis Lundy was Betty Carter's longtime bassist and a close friend of Horn. To replace Mesterhazy, Leduc hired pianist Alex Minasian. Till Brönner, who worked with Murphy on Once to Every Heart and Love Is What Stays accompanies on trumpet on two tunes, "But Beautiful" and "Get Out of Town". Murphy performs "Here's to Life" as a duet with pianist Alex Minasian.

== Reception ==
Bruce Lindsay, writing for All About Jazz, calls the recording a "superb tribute" and finds "Here's to Life" to be "extraordinarily affecting".

Jeanie Barton gives the release a positive review in The London Jazz News writing, "This EP is a warming tribute to two influential musicians with personal contributions from all involved...this record perfectly honors their Beautiful Friendship".

== Track listing ==
1. "A Beautiful Friendship" (Donald Kahn, Stanley Styne) – 5:22
2. "But Beautiful" (Jimmy Van Heusen, Johnny Burke) – 5:20
3. "Get Out of Town" (Cole Porter) – 4:32
4. "Here’s to Life" (Artie Butler, Phyllis Molinary) – 4:12

== Personnel ==
Performance

- Mark Murphy – vocals
- Alex Minasian – piano
- Curtis Lundy – bass (tracks 1, 2, 3)
- Steve Williams – drums (tracks 1, 2, 3)
- Till Brönner – trumpet (tracks 2 and 3)

Production

- Bob Fowler – engineer
- Stephan Branca– assistant engineer
- George Mesterhazy – concept
- Jean-Pierre Leduc – producer, cover photography
- Darrel Sheinman– producer
- Alan Foulkes – album design
- Christopher Loudon – liner notes
