= Just Jazz (Mark Murphy album) =

Live album by Mark Murphy
- Released: 1993
- Recorded: 1993
- Venue: Jazz Club in Graz, Steiermark, Austria
- Genre: Vocal jazz
- Length: 1:16:17
- Label: Jazzette
- Producer: Boško Petrović

Mark Murphy chronology
Very Early (1993)	Just Jazz (1993)	Shadows (1996)

Just Jazz is a live album by Mark Murphy.

Just Jazz is the 32nd album by American jazz vocalist Mark Murphy. It was recorded in 1993 when Murphy was 61 years old and released by the Jazzette label in Croatia in 1993. The album is a collection of jazz tunes performed with the Karlheinz Miklin Quartet live in Graz, Austria.

== Background ==
This live recording was released in Croatia but disappeared during the Bosnian war. Years later it was made available again through Bandcamp.

== Recording ==
Karlheinz Miklin and his quartet perform with Murphy on this release and Miklin would provide support again on Shadows in 1996. Murphy improvises heavily, using scat, vocalese, wordless improvisation, and poetry. Extended time is given to instrumental solos from the band.

Oliver Nelson's "Stolen Moments" with lyrics by Murphy became a signature tune for Murphy after appearing on Stolen Moments (Muse, 1978). Murphy recorded it several times and used it often in live performances. In fact, most of the tunes on this album were used in many of Murphy's live performances. "Parker´s Mood" with reading from Jack Kerouac's Subterraneans was originally released on Bop for Kerouac (Muse, 1981). "Bolero de Sata" was on 1983's Brazil Song. "Going to Chicago" was released on Murphy's 1963 Riverside album That's How I Love the Blues!. "Charleston Alley" was on 1984's Living Room (Muse). "I Remember Clifford" was released on The Artistry of Mark Murphy (Muse, 1982). Murphy first recorded "Body and Soul" and "Vera Cruz (Empty Faxes)" on Mark Murphy Sings...On the Red Clay, Naima and Other Great Songs (Muse, 1975) "Prism" was a new recording for Murphy.

== Track listing ==
1. "Stolen Moments" (Oliver Nelson, Mark Murphy) – 13:16
2. "Parker´s Mood" (Charlie Parker, King Pleasure) – 5:38
3. "Along Came Betty" (Benny Golson) – 8:57
4. "Vera Cruz" (Márcio Borges, Milton Nascimento) – 11:27
5. "Bolero de Sata" (Guinga, Paulo César Pinheiro) – 5:16
6. "Going to Chicago" (Count Basie, Jimmy Rushing) – 4:47
7. "Charleston Alley" (Hamish Henderson, Jon Hendricks, Leroy Kirkland) – 2:26
8. "I Remember Clifford" (Golson, Hendricks) – 3:55
9. "Prism" (Bill Dobbins) – 14:51
10. "Body and Soul" (Johnny Green, Frank Eyton, Edward Heyman, Robert Sour) – 5:44

== Personnel ==
Performance

- Mark Murphy – vocals
- Karlheinz Miklin – flute, saxophone
- Ewald Oberleitner – bass
- Claus Raible – piano
- Heimo Wiederhofer – drums

Production

- Hanno Ströher – engineer, recorded at Jazz Club in Graz, Steiermark, Austria (in 1993)
- Boško Petrović – producer
- Wolfgang Weidlaener – liner notes
