= Everybody Loves Me =

Everybody Loves Me may refer to:

- "Everybody Loves Me" (OneRepublic song), 2009
- "Everybody Loves Me", a 1997 song by Mark Murphy from Song for the Geese
- "Everybody Loves Me", a 2010 song by Prince from 20Ten
