= Wild and Free: Live at the Keystone Korner =

1980 live album by Mark Murphy

Live album by Mark Murphy
- Released: 2017
- Recorded: 1980
- Venue: Keystone Korner
- Genre: Vocal jazz
- Length: 59:00
- Label: HighNote
- Producer: Todd Barkan

Mark Murphy chronology
Live in Italy 2001 (2016)	Wild and Free: Live at the Keystone Korner (2017)

Wild and Free: Live at the Keystone Korner is a 1980 live album by Mark Murphy.

Wild and Free: Live at the Keystone Korner is the 49th album by American jazz vocalist Mark Murphy. It was recorded when Murphy was 48 years old and released by the HighNotes Records label in the United States in 2017, two years after his death. The release is a varied collection of tunes and styles associated with Murphy over the span of his career from the 1950s up to 1980.

== Background ==
At the time of this live set, Murphy was enjoying one of the high points of his career at 48 years old. James Gavin points out in the liner notes that the 1978 Stolen Moments album on Muse had been a success and the title track, with Murphy's own lyrics, had received a lot of airplay. Vocalese was enjoying a new level of interest thanks to the success of The Manhattan Transfer and the career revival of Eddie Jefferson. Furthermore, his 1979 album Satisfaction Guaranteed was up for a 1980 Grammy award for Best Jazz Vocal Performance, Male at the 23rd annual awards. This was Murphy's first nomination for a vocal performance and it lost to George Benson, for Moody's Mood. Soon he would record his landmark release Bop for Kerouac.

== Recording ==
Mark Murphy recorded the tracks during a live concert at the Keystone Korner jazz club in San Francisco in June 1980, three years before the club closed. He had been performing extensively in the San Francisco Bay Area. Here he performs with some of his Bay area favorites at the time including his steady pianist Paul Potyen, drummer Jack Gobbetti, bassist Peter Barshay, and Babatunde Lea on percussion. Club owner Todd Barkan produced the release.

The tunes reflect Murphy's career up to that point, from the 1950s ("Body and Soul") to the then present ("I Return to Music" on Satisfaction Guaranteed), from ballads to bebop to Brazilian jazz. Songs from his Riverside years and his Muse years were included.

== Reception ==
Peter Jones calls the release, "a varied and fascinating set" full of "musical daring", varied settings and changes in tempo. James Gavin says, "It captures him in what may have been his finest period. His singing is fresh, mature, and just wild enough, with a control and discipline he often abandoned in later years. His creativity is on fire, his heart wide open".

Christopher Louden highly praised the album in his JazzTimes review. He wrote that the live "set represents Murphy at his absolute finest and most limber, the sheer joy he takes in interpretive bending and twisting anchored by an unwavering sangfroid. Murphy proves, as expected, masterful at shaping a set list at once familiar and unexpected, supported by his then-regular pianist, Paul Potyen, and a trio of his preferred local players.

== Track listing ==
1. "I Return to Music" (Kirby Shaw) – 5:53
2. "Farmer's Market" (Art Farmer, Annie Ross) – 2:46
3. "Spring Medley: It Might as Well Be Spring / Spring Can Really Hang You Up the Most" (Richard Rodgers, Oscar Hammerstein II / Tommy Wolf, Fran Landesman) – 6:27
4. "Stompin' at the Savoy" (Benny Goodman, Edgar Sampson, Chick Webb, Andy Razaf) – 5:31
5. "You Fascinate Me So" (Cy Coleman, Carolyn Leigh) – 3:40
6. "Bijou" (Ralph Burns, Jon Hendricks) – 3:30
7. "Fiesta in Blue" (Goodman, Jimmy Mundy) – 3:08
8. "Body and Soul" (Johnny Green, Frank Eyton, Edward Heyman, Robert Sour) – 5:35
9. "Waters of March" (Antônio Carlos Jobim) – 3:37
10. "Laugh Clown Laugh / Send in the Clowns" (Richard Andrew Thorburn / Stephen Sondheim) – 2:50
11. "Charleston Alley" (Hamish Henderson, Hendricks, Leroy Kirkland) – 2:30
12. "Blues in the Night" (Harold Arlen, Johnny Mercer) – 4:28
13. "I've Got You Under My Skin" (Cole Porter) – 4:35
14. "Don't Be Blue" (Michael Franks, John Guerin) – 3:40
15. Introducing the Band – 1:04

== Personnel ==
Performance

- Mark Murphy – vocals,
- Peter Barshay – bass
- Babatunde Lea – percussion
- Paul Potyen – piano
- Jack Gobbetti – drums

Production

- Jon Rosenberg – engineer, co-producer, mastering, editing
- Todd Barkan – producer
- Joe Fields – co-producer
- Brian McMillen – photography
- Keiji Obata – design
- James Gavin – liner notes
- Tory Sanoa – tape to digital transfers
