= Skylark (song) =

Song written by Johnny Mercer and Hoagy Carmichael

Single
- Released: 1942
- Songwriters: Johnny Mercer, Hoagy Carmichael

"Skylark" is an American popular song with lyrics by Johnny Mercer and music by Hoagy Carmichael, published in 1941. The lilting melody has attracted many jazz interpretations for its technical complexity which, when mastered, delivers an expressive peacefulness. Mercer wrote the romantic lyrics following his affair with Judy Garland.

The song is considered a jazz standard.

== Background ==
Carmichael wrote the melody, based on a Bix Beiderbecke cornet improvisation, as "Bix Licks", for a project to turn the novel Young Man With a Horn into a Broadway musical. After that project failed, Carmichael brought in Johnny Mercer to write lyrics for the song. Mercer said that he struggled for a year before he could get the lyrics right. Mercer recalled that Carmichael initially called him several times about the lyrics but had forgotten about the song by the time Mercer finally wrote them. He got the title, "Skylark", from a billboard advertisement, and then the words came to him quickly. The yearning expressed in the lyrics was based on Mercer's longing for Judy Garland, with whom he had an affair.

Several artists recorded charting versions of the song in 1942, including the Glenn Miller Orchestra (vocal by Ray Eberle), Harry James and His Orchestra (vocal by Helen Forrest), Dinah Shore, and Bing Crosby. The Glenn Miller recording on RCA Bluebird peaked at number 7 on the Billboard pop singles chart.

The song may have inspired the model name for the Buick Skylark automobile, produced from 1953 to 1998.

== Notable cover versions ==
- 1941: Harry James with Helen Forrest. This reached number 11 on the Billboard charts in 1942.
- 1942: Bing Crosby with John Scott Trotter and His Orchestra. This also charted in 1942 reaching a peak position of No.14.
  - Glenn Miller and His Orchestra with vocals by Ray Eberle in 1942, rising to number 7 on the charts.
  - Dinah Shore recorded February 10, 1942 for Bluebird. This reached the number 5 spot in the Billboard charts.
- 1962: Art Blakey with Freddie Hubbard – Caravan
- 1975: Saxophonist Stan Getz with pianist/singer Jimmy Rowles – The Peacocks
- 1984: Linda Ronstadt reached number 12 on the Billboard Adult Contemporary Chart in January 1985 – Lush Life.
- 1995: Cassandra Wilson – New Moon Daughter
- 2005: Mark Murphy – Once to Every Heart
