= Doodlin' (Horace Silver song) =

Composition by Horace Silver

from the album Horace Silver Quintet, Vol. 2
- Language: English
- Recorded: November 13, 1954
- Genre: Jazz; hard bop
- Label: Blue Note
- Composer: Horace Silver
- Producer: Alfred Lion

"Doodlin'" is a composition by jazz pianist Horace Silver. The original version, by Silver's quintet, was recorded on November 13, 1954. It was soon covered by other musicians, including with lyrics added by Jon Hendricks. It has become a jazz standard.

== Composition ==
"Doodlin'" is a 12-bar blues. Reviewer Bill Kirchner suggests, "Take a simple riff, rhythmically displace it several times over D-flat blues harmonies, resolve it with a staccato, quasi-humorous phrase, and you have 'Doodlin''."

== Original recording ==
The original version featured Silver on piano, with Hank Mobley (tenor saxophone), Kenny Dorham (trumpet), Doug Watkins (bass), and Art Blakey (drums). It is played as a "medium-tempo blues with a two-beat feel". Silver's solo is largely blues-based, with little influence from bebop, and is formed around motifs.

"Doodlin'" was released as a single along with "The Preacher"; the pairing "might be the first example of a jazz hit single going on to boost sales of its source album – or, as here, albums". They helped popularize hard bop.

== Later versions ==
The song was soon covered by other musicians, including Ray Charles (on his album The Great Ray Charles, 1956). Jon Hendricks added lyrics, performed with Lambert, Hendricks & Ross; after Annie Ross left the group in 1962, the song was also included on the 1963 Lambert, Hendricks & Bavan album Recorded "Live" at Basin Street East. Some other versions were recorded by Sarah Vaughan (on her album No Count Sarah, 1958), Mark Murphy (on Rah, 1961), Baby Washington (on That's How Heartaches Are Made, 1963), Harry James (on his Twenty-fifth Anniversary Album, MGM SE4214, 1964), and Dusty Springfield (on Ev'rything's Coming Up Dusty, 1965).
