= Song for the Geese (Mark Murphy album) =

- Original album cover photo by Eddie O'Sullivan

Studio album by Mark Murphy
- Released: 1997
- Recorded: 1995
- Studio: Triad Studios, Redmond, WA
- Genre: Vocal jazz
- Length: 1:04:00
- Label: RCA Victor
- Producer: Charlie Ellicott

Mark Murphy chronology
North Sea Jazz Sessions, Volume 5 (1996)	Song for the Geese (1997)	Some Time Ago (1999)

Song for the Geese is a 1997 studio album by Mark Murphy.

Song for the Geese is the 36th recorded album by American jazz vocalist Mark Murphy. It was released by BMG on RCA Victor in the United States in 1997. Murphy developed the idea for the album during a period in the 1990's when the singer felt his career was in decline, especially in the US. Murphy was always known for being experimental, pushing the edge, and exploring new ground. As he entered his early 60's, his idea was for an approach for the young jazz audience, with a contemporary sound. Murphy considered himself a rhythm singer but this time the emphasis would be on the voice, his and the vocal backgrounds provided by the group Full Voice.

== Background ==
In his book, This is Hip: The Life of Mark Murphy, author Peter Jones writes that Mark Murphy's lyrics to "Song for the Geese" were "testament to his belief in mating for life". Years before recording the album, Murphy and Bill Mays, his then music arranger, heard bassist Sean Smith and his band perform Smith's composition as an instrumental at the New York club Village Gate. Murphy was inspired to write lyrics to the tune which are "a tribute to his family, and in memory to his childhood days at Fair Haven". Jones quotes Murphy, "These Canadian geese would come ... and we'd just watch them". According to Jones, "it was also a tribute to Eddie O'Sullivan", (Murphy's partner).

In an interview during an appearance with Marian McPartland on NPR’s Piano Jazz in 1998, just after performing "Song for the Geese" with composer Sean Smith on bass, Mark Murphy said, “I wrote the words about a beautiful situation with some Canadian geese that happened in my youth...The funny thing is that Sean has an emotional family memory from geese with his family also, as I did. This is an allegory of what happened when I was a kid in upstate New York”.

After an engagement in Seattle, Murphy developed the idea for an album different from any of his previous releases. He contacted vocal arranger Roger Treece for help with a vocal arrangement and choir back up for "Song for the Geese". The intent was for the listener to experience the song intimately as though you were "in a room with 60 voices totally encircling you, and you were so close together that you could touch them". Murphy liked the sound and hoped it would revive his career. Years later in an interview with Ted Pankin for Jazziz, Murphy listed Song for the Geese along with Rah and Midnight Mood among his favorite personal recordings.

== Recording ==
After four weeks of rehearsal the album was recorded in April 1995 with funding from an interested business entrepreneur. But there were delays in the funding. There were technical mishaps. One of the lead vocal lines was erased and had to be replaced. A mistake during the initial transfer of the original 24 tracks from ADAT to the master CD resulted in the initial 300 CDs being released to Murphy in mono. They took the delay as an opportunity to remix and add more percussion.

In 1996, a year after recording he still hadn't found a label to release the album. Then Murphy won the 1996 61st annual DownBeat Readers' Poll for Best Male Singer. In a DownBeat feature and interview with Dan Ouellette in 1997 Murphy says,

"I had this idea six years ago for an album with a youth jazz approach ... It took me three or four years to do the record because I had no moola, and then it took another two years of shopping it first to major labels and then to small companies. And even then there were no serious takers. But as soon as the results of the Down Beat poll came out, I began to get calls from ....very important people."

With the poll results and with help from producers Cindy Bitterman, Werner Geier and club DJ and journalist Samir Köck, a deal was finally made in 1997 with BMG Ariola to release the record on RCA Victor.

Murphy contributes original lyrics on this release (tracks 5 and 7). Murphy had wanted to record Steely Dan's hit "Do it Again" for years and it was included on the album.

== Reception ==
Professional ratings
Review scores
Source	Rating
Virgin Encyclopedia of Popular Music	3/5 stars
AllMusic	4/5 stars
MusicHound	4/5 stars
The Penguin Guide to Jazz	(4)/4 stars
Rolling Stone Jazz & Blues Album Guide	3.5/5 stars
DownBeat	2.5/5 stars
Stereo Review	4/5 stars

In his book, A Biographical Guide to the Great Jazz and Pop Singers, author Will Friedwald says that Song for the Geese was Murphy's first release with a major label (BMG) since his days at Capitol. He notes that in the release, "There are standards, there are ballads, there are jazz numbers, and yes there are bossa novas, and there is also a treatment of the British standard "You're Blasé", which begins with a Kerouacian rap, and ends with a "rant" of the kind that Kurt Elling learned from him. And there are tasteful, even welcome elements of deejay culture, sampling, overdubbing, electronica, breaks, and beats". Writing in Stereo Review, Friedwald assigned the album a 4 star rating (very good).

Murphy was nominated for a Grammy award in the Best Jazz Vocal Performance category for Song of the Geese at the 40th annual Grammy Awards but lost to Dee Dee Bridgewater for Dear Ella.

The AllMusic entry written by Scott Yanow gives the album 4 stars. Yanow points out that, "Each song features Murphy's eccentric singing (which sometimes finds him jumping between low notes and falsetto) and there is a lot of variety in mood and style". He goes on to say, "this CD does an excellent job of showing where Mark Murphy was musically in the late '90s". Yanow also includes the album in his list of worthy recordings by Mark Murphy in his book The Jazz Singers: The Ultimate Guide.

The Virgin Encyclopedia of Popular Music rates the release as good (3/5). Andrew Gilbert, writing for MusicHound Jazz, assigns the recording 4 bones in the "best of the rest" category. The Penguin Guide to Jazz assigns qualified 4 stars (***(*), meaning a fine record with exceptional music kept out of the front rank with minor reservations) and the entry says, "You have to be a Murphy believer to agree with the rating, since this is the man at his most idiosyncratic and personal...The arrangements stick to a trusted small group formula, dappled a little by synths and the surprisingly effective use of the vocal group, Full Voice". John Swenson, in The Rolling Stone Jazz & Blues Album Guide, assigns the album 3.5 stars (good to excellent, representing an artist's near peak performance).

Dan Ouellette, writing in a feature in DownBeat in 1997 singles out for praise, "a gem of a rendition of Stephen Sondheim's 'I Remember (Sky)', a rousing, off-the-cuff, hip-scatting take on 'Baltimore Oriole' and an upbeat zip through Steely Dan's 'Do It Again'.

Paul de Barros, writing in DownBeat magazine in 1998, says, "I don't much care for Song, a pop project that shouts "let's go for it" with winning abandon, yet can't disguise the fact that Murphy doesn't do this sort of thing well" and assigns a 2.5 stars rating. He gives "two thumbs down for the percussive, r&b sneering on Steely Dan's 'Do It Again' and the slurring, lounge-crooner diction ('I sincerely wanna zay ...') on 'I Wish You Love'. Why turn 'Baltimore Oriole' into breathless acid-jazz"? But he goes on to say,

"On ballads, Murphy shines. The confessional "Song for the Geese", sardonic "Everybody Loves Me", vulnerable "Lament" (J.J. Johnson's) and the absolutely touching "I Remember" by Stephen Sondheim, shimmer with bittersweet longing...But then I've always found Murphy's autumnal moods more plausible than his exuberant, show-biz side, even when his foggy baritone is as velvety as his cummerbund".

Indeed, in the 1997 DownBeat piece, the previous year, Murphy is quoted as saying,

“I love doing ballads. That’s when I feel I can communicate one-to-one with listeners. People tell me that it’s as if I’m singing directly to them. I’ve been a part of marriages and divorce settlements, child conceptions and wakes, my fans keep my albums for years. They come up to me at my live shows with these scratchy LPs and ask me to sign them. I never sold a million albums, but those I did sell are still out there. Shirley [Horn], Sheila [Jordan] and I seem to be the last of our generation. But the gold is that when you reach maturity as vocalists, you begin to sing your life. You’re not just performing. You’re putting your life into your songs."

Author, singer, musician, and composer Peter Jones notes that response to the release was mixed. Some fans loved it and others were disappointed. A fan publication, Mark's Times, posted a negative review, finding the album too rock oriented. But Murphy was happy with the sales figures and the Grammy nomination, his 5th.

Bret Primack highly praised the album in his JazzTimes review. He wrote, "Song For The Geese is the quintessential recording of an extraordinary singer and lyricist. On his first recording for a major label in three decades, Murphy’s vibrant vocals are vitalized by inventive, energized arrangements . . . The 65-year-old cool cat of vocalese, indisputably the hippest hip male singer on the scene today, has reached a lofty creative plateau here, not just performing but living each song".

== Track listing ==
1. "You Go to My Head" (Haven Gillespie, J. Fred Coots) – 6:19
2. "Sugar" (Stanley Turrentine) – 3:37
3. "Baltimore Oriole" (Paul Francis Webster, Hoagy Carmichael) – 4:01
4. "Do It Again" (Walter Becker, Donald Fagen) – 4:34
5. "(Baby) It's Just Talk" (Mark Murphy, Pat Metheny) – 8:34
6. "You're Blasé" (Bruce Sievier, Ord Hamilton)– 5:22
7. "Song for the Geese" (Mark Murphy, Sean Smith)– 7:41
8. "Everybody Loves Me" (Manny Boyd, Andy Lutter)– 6:10
9. "Lament" (Jon Hendricks, J.J. Johnson)– 3:55
10. "I Remember" (Stephen Sondheim)– 4:46
11. "We Two (Nos Dois)" (Luiz Avellar, Milton Nascimento) – 4:36
12. "I Wish You Love" (Charles Trenet, Léo Chauliac) – 3:58

== Personnel ==
Performance

- Mark Murphy – vocals
- Doug Miller – bass
- John Bishop – drums
- Marc Seales – piano
- Full Voice – choir
  - Roger Treece – vocals
  - Sandra Anderson – vocals
  - Lincoln Briney – vocals

Production

- Dave Dysart – engineer
- H. K. Miller – executive producer
- Charlie Ellicott – producer
- OKA – cover
- Udo Titz – photography
- Samir H. Köck – liner notes
