= Lee Katzman =

American jazz trumpeter (1928–2013)

Lee Katzman (May 17, 1928 – August 1, 2013) was an American jazz trumpeter.

== Biography ==
Katzman was Chicago-born and Indianapolis-raised. In his early career, Katzman played primarily in big band settings. Arriving in New York in the late 1940s, he played in the big bands of Gene Krupa and Claude Thornhill, Sam Donahue, Buddy Rich, Jimmy Dorsey, and Benny Goodman. In 1956 he relocated to California, where he was invited to join the Stan Kenton band as a jazz soloist, both on recordings and on worldwide tours. In the late 1950s and 1960s he worked with Pepper Adams, Les Brown, June Christy, Bob Dorough, Walter Norris, Med Flory, Bill Holman, Teddy Edwards, Mel Lewis, Shelly Manne, Les McCann, Anita O'Day, Jimmy Rowles, and Sonny Stitt. Known for his clear tone and fearless, acrobatic solos, he was often a featured soloist in Bill Holman's Great Big Band and Terry Gibbs Dream Band, as well as both the NBC and CBS orchestras. He later became a member of Herb Albert's Baja Marimba Band. After relocating to New York in 1980, he played informal gigs around town with Bob Dorough, Walter Norris and John Bunch. He retired with his wife, Judy, to Taos, New Mexico in 2011. Katzman died in Taos on August 1, 2013, at age 85. He is survived by three children from his first marriage; his wife, Judy; and musician son, Theo Katzman.

== Discography ==
=== As leader ===
- Beautiful (Teddy Edwards, tenor sax; Jack Wilson, piano; Leroy Vinnegar, bass; Nick Martinis, drums)
- Lee Katzman Meets Supersax (Lee Katzman with Med Flory, alto; Jay Migliore, tenor; Ray Reed, tenor; Jack Nimitz, baritone; Jimmy Rowles, piano; Bob Magnusson, bass; Donald Bailey, drums

=== As band member ===
- Critic's Choice, Pepper Adams, 1957
- Jive for Five, Bill Holman, 1958
- Jazz in a Weather Vane, Jimmy Rowles, 1958
- Back to Balboa, Stan Kenton 1958
- Mark Murphy's Hip Parade, Mark Murphy 1959
- Bill Holman Great Big Band, 1961
- Skabadabba, Bob Dorough
- Live at the Summit, Terry Gibbs Dream Band
