= Crazy Rhythm: His Debut Recordings =

Compilation album by Mark Murphy
- Released: 1999
- Recorded: 1956–1957
- Genre: Vocal jazz
- Length: 59:58
- Label: Decca
- Producer: Orrin Keepnews

Crazy Rhythm is a 1999 compilation of singer Mark Murphy's Decca label recordings in 1956–1957.

== Background ==
Crazy Rhythm collects all but four of Murphy's recordings from his first release for Decca, Meet Mark Murphy (The Singing "M"), and all of his second release, Let Yourself Go.

== Recording ==
Under producer Milt Gabler's direction Murphy recorded with Decca from 1955 to 1957. Many of the recordings have never been released in any form. Author Peter Jones' discography documents 60 unreleased Decca recordings. Murphy recorded the tracks for Meet Mark Murphy with arranger Ralph Burns in 1956 and Let Yourself Go in 1957. According to Murphy, Burns made very few changes to the arrangements Murphy himself conceived for the recordings.

== Reception ==
Professional ratings
Review scores
Source	Rating
AllMusic	3/5 stars

Stephen Thomas Erlewine writes, "the singer wasn't the cutting-edge risk-taker he would evolve into in the 1960s. The young Murphy heard on this CD is a likable crooner with a strong passion for Mel Torme".He singles out for praise "Fascinating Rhythm" and "Exactly Like You".

Scott Yanow recommends the release in his book The Jazz Singers: The Ultimate Guide.

Will Friedwald said that the taken together albums made during his early recording career from 1956 to 1960 "reveal a young singer with a strong, dark, attractive voice, with a lot of good ideas and an obvious commitment to the jazz idiom-but one who stops just short of having a sound and a style of his own".Friedwald wrote, "As Murphy himself noted, the audience for these songs just wasn't his, and vice versa-even though he succeeded in doing something aesthetically interesting and indeed hip with material that no one would have thought could lend itself to such a treatment".

== Track listing ==
No.	Title	Lyrics	Music	Album	Length
1.	"Fascinating Rhythm"	Ira Gershwin	George Gershwin	Meet Mark Murphy	2:06
2.	"A Nightingale Sang in Berkeley Square"	Eric Maschwitz	Manning Sherwin	Meet Mark Murphy	3:54
3.	"Give It Back to the Indians"	Lorenz Hart	Richard Rodgers	Meet Mark Murphy	3:19
4.	"Guess I'll Hang My Tears Out to Dry"	Sammy Cahn	Jule Styne	Meet Mark Murphy	3:42
5.	"Limehouse Blues"	Douglas Furber	Philip Braham	Meet Mark Murphy	2:34
6.	"Exactly Like You"	Dorothy Fields	Jimmy McHugh	Meet Mark Murphy	2:42
7.	"If I Could Be With You (One Hour Tonight)"	Henry Creamer	James P. Johnson	Meet Mark Murphy	2:42
8.	"You Mustn't Kick It Around"	Hart	Rodgers	Meet Mark Murphy	2:34
9.	"I Got Rhythm"	Ira Gershwin	George Gershwin	Let Yourself Go	2:27
10.	"Elmer's Tune"	Elmer Albrecht, Sammy Gallop, Dick Jurgens	Albrecht / Gallop / Jurgens	Let Yourself Go	2:43
11.	"'Tain't No Sin (To Dance Around in Your Bones)"	Edgar Leslie	Walter Donaldson	Let Yourself Go	2:16
12.	"Robbins Nest"	Sir Charles Thompson, Illinois Jacquet	Thompson, Jacquet	Let Yourself Go	3:45
13.	"The Lady in Red"	Mort Dixon	Allie Wrubel	Let Yourself Go	3:49
14.	"Pick Yourself Up"	Fields	Jerome Kern	Let Yourself Go	2:31
15.	"Let Yourself Go"	Irving Berlin	Berlin	Let Yourself Go	2:23
16.	"Crazy Rhythm"	Irving Caesar	Roger Wolfe Kahn / Joseph Meyer	Let Yourself Go	2:57
17.	"Taking a Chance on Love"	Ted Fetter / John Latouche	Vernon Duke	Let Yourself Go	4:05
18.	"Lullaby in Rhythm"	Clarence Profit, Benny Goodman, Edgar Sampson, Walter Hirsch	Goodman, Profit, Sampson, Hirsch	Let Yourself Go	2:58
19.	"Little Jazz Bird"	Ira Gershwin	George Gershwin	Let Yourself Go	2:32
20.	"Ridin' High"	Cole Porter	Porter	Let Yourself Go	2:26
Total length:					59:58

== Personnel ==
Orrin Keepnews – producer
