= Once to Every Heart =

Studio album by Mark Murphy
- Released: 2005
- Recorded: 2002
- Venue: Berlin
- Genre: Vocal jazz
- Length: 57:00
- Label: Verve Records
- Producer: Till Brönner

Mark Murphy chronology
Dim the Lights (2004)	Once to Every Heart (2005)	Love is What Stays (2006)

Once to Every Heart is a 2005 studio album by Mark Murphy.

Once to Every Heart is the 44th recorded album by American jazz vocalist Mark Murphy. It was recorded when Murphy was 70 years old and released by Verve Records three years later in the United States in 2005. The release is a collection of torch songs and ballads praised by many reviews as a late career masterpiece by Mark Murphy. The project was spearheaded by producer Till Brönner after recording with Murphy for Brönner's album Blue Eyed Soul.

Mark Murphy recorded Once to Every Heart in two days at Till's Studio, Berlin in 2002 with Brönner and pianist Frank Chastenier. Orchestrations were later added by Nan Schwartz. The release includes Murphy's own composition "I Know You From Somewhere" (track 5). Brönner wrote "Our Game" with Rob Hoare.

== Background ==
Peter Jones in the biography This is Hip: The Life of Mark Murphy, and James Gavin in the liner notes to Once to Every Heart, both describe the initial encounter between Murphy and Brönner and the development of the album. Author Jones recounts that Brönner was passing by the A-Trane jazz club in Berlin after a radio engagement in 2001 and saw that Murphy was performing. Brönner, listening from the front of the stage in the half-empty club, "became aware that Murphy was directing the local trio in a way he had never seen a singer do before. And when Mark sat down alone at the piano to accompany himself on a ballad at the end of the show, Brönner found that tears were rolling down his cheeks". It was the first time Brönner had seen Murphy live. Brönner told James Gavin that Murphy "was absolutely brilliant, showing the trio what he wanted onstage by almost 'conducting' with his voice...I started crying because it touched me so much".

After their meeting, Murphy later recorded "Dim the Lights" on Brönner's own Blue Eyed Soul in a trip-hop style. Brönner said, "as he was leaving the studio, I put to him the idea of recording an album in there. He said, 'What kind of album?' I said, 'I remember that evening at the A-Trane, and very few things in life have moved me as much as that performance". But Murphy was reluctant to do an all ballad album. Brönner persisted. Jones writes, "His insight was that Murphy possessed the rare ability to tap into profound, half-buried emotional conflicts, in a way that made his ballad performances extremely moving". Brönner said, "For me, only Frank Sinatra has the same ability to make me feel he is speaking to me when he sings...The songs that Mark sounded so good on were the ones that contained a big unresolved emotion. The mother of all love songs is disappointment, unrequited love, and that's something that you feel you shouldn't show".

Dan Ouellette interviewed Murphy for a feature article in DownBeat in 1997. Murphy said, “I love doing ballads. That's when I feel I can communicate one-to-one with listeners. People tell me that it's as if I'm singing directly to them... But the gold is that when you reach maturity as vocalists, you begin to sing your life. You're not just performing. You're putting your life into your songs." Author Will Friedwald points out that Once to Every Heart was Murphy's first release for a major label since Song For the Geese eight years earlier and his first album of standards and ballads in nearly two decades.

== Recording ==
Mark Murphy recorded the tracks in two days in 2002 at Till's Studio, Berlin with Till Brönner and Frank Chastenier. Orchestrations were later added at Teldex Studio in Berlin. Their idea was to create an atmosphere of relaxation and intimacy. Murphy was close-miked and the only other musicians in the studio were Brönner and pianist Frank Chastenier. Brönner's own contributions were sparse. Brönner said, "What could you possibly add after this guy sang"?

Murphy later gave Brönner a recording of his that he liked with string arrangements by Nan Schwartz, a student of Johnny Mandel's. Brönner contacted Schwartz. And after listening to tapes of what Murphy had recorded in Brönner's studio, Schwartz said, "I am absolutely overwhelmed by what I'm hearing, and I have to be part of this production. No matter what kind of budget you have, we'll find a way to do it." Schwartz did string arrangements to fit around the existing recordings, added bassist Christian Von Kaphengst, flutes, and overdubbed the original recordings in Berlin, conducting the Deutsches Symphonie Orchester.

Speaking with Ted Pankin in a Jazziz interview about working with orchestrator Nan Schwartz, Murphy said, "I wasn't there when the orchestra was put on. In the old days, everything you heard on the LPs was done right there, including the strings. I don't know whether I prefer it or not. Well, see, with Nan Schwartz, she has a sixth sense about how I sing, and so I have no worries there".

After the orchestrations were added Brönner was able to convince Universal/Verve to release the project though they had been initially uninterested. However, Murphy was under contract with HighNote and so there was a long delay in releasing the album. The album's title song was one that Murphy had been carrying for decades, ever since he heard the Jo Stafford single from 1952 written by Paul Weston, Stafford's husband with lyrics by Michael S Stoner.

In the liner notes, Murphy describes the album as "one of the greatest thrills of my career." He told James Gavin, "I guess maybe it's the best thing I've done". "I don't ever want to record any other way," he told Jazz Times...I'd like to make a couple more records like that and see where it leads us." Gavin describes Murphy as "a bruised romantic who goes fearlessly into the dark places of the soul. He is miked so closely here that not a crevice of his voice is unexposed...The results are as stark and powerful as BIllie Holiday's Lady in Satin". Gavin calls Murphy "one of the greatest singer-storytellers in jazz". He characterizes Murphy's voice as "a rugged bass-baritone...now richer then ever".

== Reception ==
Professional ratings
Review scores
Source	Rating
AllMusic	4/5 stars
The Guardian	3/5 stars
The Penguin Guide to Jazz	(3)/4 stars

The AllMusic entry gives the album 4 stars. In the review Thom Jurek writes, "Mark Murphy has, for decades, given listeners breathtaking performances that underscore the very heart of song itself." Jurek says, "Ultimately, this is Murphy's finest recording in over a decade, and should be embraced by anyone with a remote interest in great singers, and by those who are deeply attached to ballads or torch tomes. This is essential listening." He singles out the track 2 and 3 medleys for praise, and Duke Ellington's "Do Nothin' Till You Hear from Me" as "one of the finest, most unsentimental and burningly sensual versions of the song ever recorded". He calls the final track (Gershwin's "Our Love Is Here to Stay") "simply beguiling and mischievous".

The Penguin Guide to Jazz assigns 3 stars (meaning a good if middleweight set; one that lacks the stature or consistency of the finest records, but which is certainly rewarding on its own terms) and the review says, "The Verve album looks like a slightly strange one-off. The setting is the kind of lush, rhapsodic mood which Brönner's records have customarily been involved with, and Murphy certainly sounds like he's enjoying the upholstery. But it's rather one-noted: creakingly slow tempos throughout, and after 30 minutes or so one longs for a burst of familiar Murphy adrenalin".

John Fordham assigns 3/5 stars in The Guardian review and states that Murphy's performances "are evidence of the audacity that has made him such a unique performer over almost half a century". Fordham finds the interaction between Murphy and Brönner to be the core of the album and says Murphy's "uncanny timing is as bold and faultless as ever on "Our Love Is Here to Stay".

Biographer Peter Jones calls the recordings on this release, "some of the greatest music of Mark Murphy's career". Jones finds an "unusual degree of rapport between Murphy and Brönner, helped in no small measure by the 70-year-old's road-roughened gravel in combination with the trumpet's high, breathy Baker-like notes. Murphy's wide vocal range is particularly evident here, now that he could descend as far as the E-flat two octaves below middle C". Jones highlights the title track, "Our Game", "Bein' Green", and the "medley of "Skylark", a tune of romantic longing, and "You Don't Know What Love Is", one of anguished loss" which "really twists" "the emotional knife".

Will Friedwald calls “I Know You from Somewhere,” one of Murphy's most successful original compositions. Friedwald heard Murphy explain during a live performance that the song was written "in the immediate after math of 9/11 and that it described two people encountering each other again in this frightening new world". In his book, A Biographical Guide to the Great Jazz and Pop Singers, Friedwald writes, "There is no one better at taking a familiar or even unfamiliar old song and turning it inside out, spilling its guts and finding the feeling underneath. What has never been clearer than now is that at his best, Murphy does not abstract and skewer a song merely for the sake of being different, but to get at its inner meaning. By making you think differently about a song you've heard before, he makes it relevant and meaningful all over again". Friedwald also highlights "I'm Through With Love", saying Murphy's falsetto "may be the most creative use of the falsetto in jazz singing since Cab Calloway".

Author Andrew Rowan acknowledges Murphy as one of the best interpreters of the Great American Songbook and finds him at his top in this release of ballads only, praising his rhythmic sense, intonation, melodic improvisation, emotional expressiveness, and story telling ability. Biographer Peter Jones included "Our Game" (track 4) in his article "10 tracks by Mark Murphy I Can't Do Without" in the London Jazz News series "10 Tracks I Can't Do Without". The Jazzwise (UK) October 2005 review said, "A triumphant reminder of the enduring brilliance of a vocalist whose name should be mentioned in the same breath as the Sinatras, Hendricks and Beys of this world." The JazzTimes December 2005 review said, "Born out of Murphy's understandable admiration for eerily Chet Baker-esque German trumpeter Till Bronner...In a year crowded with laudable releases, the single finest jazz-vocal album of 2005". The Jazz Rag (Birmingham, UK) December 2005 review said, "Murphy sounds more vulnerable and exposed than ever before. Very close miking reveals every nuance of his voice in minute detail. Sometimes his singing is full bodied and passionate. Far more often it is quiet and very intimate, with silence used to great dramatic effect". The 2005 Down Beat review said, "It's thrilling to hear an old master reach a new level of artistry". Scott Yanow includes the album in his list of "other worthy recordings of the last twenty years" by Mark Murphy in his book The Jazz Singers: The Ultimate Guide. Yanow also reviewed the album in Jazziz in 2006 singling out "Once to Every Heart", "I'm Through With Love", and the "Skylark" medley, praising Murphy's subtle improvisations, attention to the lyrics. He said Murphy's 70 year old voice was still "very much in its prime".

Speaking of Murphy's bass-baritone voice in a 1997 Village Voice article, James Gavin said it was “as agile and resonant as Ben Webster's saxophone”, it “seems to creep from the shadows of some long-ago jazz dive. In person he tends toward wild, boppish deconstructions of jazz standards, but most of his devotees favor his ballads, in which the most idyllic sentiments can sound painfully raw." Murphy recorded Once to Every Heart as he entered his early 70s. Of course his voice had changed over the decades. Peter Jones wrote, “His voice retained both its accuracy and its extraordinary range into old age. Although his original model was the trumpet of Miles Davis, the voice was more akin to the trombone or French horn. By his seventies, it had acquired a gnarled and leathery maturity that added poignancy to his late recordings, particularly Once to Every Heart and Love is What Stays. Even as he passed 80, he was able to sing beautifully, although not consistently so”.

Christopher Louden praised the album in his JazzTimes review. He wrote, "Now at 73, when most singers have been reduced to a pale reflection of their former vibrant selves, Murphy reaches remarkable new heights (or perhaps depths is more accurate, given the album’s quietly contemplative moodiness) with his Verve debut . . . How stunning are the results? Suffice it to say that I consider this, in a year crowded with laudable releases, the single finest jazz-vocal album of 2005".

The album reportedly sold between 20,000 and 30,000 records.

== Track listing ==
1. "I'm Through With Love" (Fud Livingston, Matty Malneck, Gus Kahn) – 7:36
2. "When I Fall in Love / My One and Only Love" (Victor Young, Edward Heyman / Robert Mellin, Guy Wood) – 5:06
3. "Skylark / You Don't Know What Love Is" (Hoagy Carmichael, Johnny Mercer / Gene de Paul, Don Raye) – 6:22
4. "Our Game" (Till Brönner, Rob Hoare) – 6:14
5. "I Know You From Somewhere" (Mark Murphy) – 6:40
6. "Bein' Green" (Joe Raposo) – 5:00
7. "Once to Every Heart" (Paul Weston, Michael S. Stoner) – 8:41
8. "It Never Entered My Mind" (Richard Rodgers, Lorenz Hart) – 3:59
9. "Do Nothing Till You Hear From Me" (Duke Ellington, Bob Russell) – 4:34
10. "Love Is Here to Stay" (George Gershwin, Ira Gershwin) – 3:02

== Personnel ==
Performance

- Mark Murphy – vocals, arranger (vocal, piano and horn arrangements), and piano (on track 9)
- Till Brönner – trumpet, flugelhorn, arranger (vocal, piano and horn arrangements)
- Christian Von Kaphengst – bass (tracks 1,3,4,5,7,9)
- Nan Schwartz – orchestral arrangements and conductor (tracks 1,3,4,5,7,9)
- Frank Chastenier – piano, arranger (vocal, piano and horn arrangements)
- Deutsches Symphonie Orchester – orchestra
- Joris Bartsch Buhle – concertmaster
- Christian Büttner, Daniel Draganov, Martin Eßmann, Anne Feltz, Brigitte Käser, Juliana Maniak, Anna Morgunova, Hannes Neubert, Michiko Prysiasznik, Pjotr Prysiasznik, Song Qiang, Ralf Zettl, Barbara Sadowski, Susanne Tribut and Barbara Weigle – violin
- Holger Herzog, Atsuko Matsuaki, Reinald Ross, Martin Schaller, Christoph Starke, Gabriel Tamayo – viola
- Agnieszka Antonina Bartsch, Ulf Borgwart, David Hausdorf, Volkmar Weiche – cello
- Igor Prokopec, Markus Rex, Martin Schaal – bass
- Tilmann Dehnhard, Christian Raake – flute

Production

- Holger Schwark – engineer (basic tracks recorded at Till's Studio, Berlin)
- Tobias Lehmann – engineer (orchestral recordings at Teldex Studio, Berlin)
- Till Brönner – producer, executive producer, mixer
- Michael Schöbel – executive producer
- Pino Brönner – executive producer
- Arne Schumann – mixer
- Götz-Michael Rieth – mastering (at Berliner Studios, Berlin)
- Billy & Hells – photography
- Scrollan – artwork
- James Gavin – liner notes
