= That's How I Love the Blues! =

Studio album by Mark Murphy
- Released: 1963
- Recorded: October–December 1962; New York City
- Genre: Jazz
- Length: 38:24
- Label: Riverside; RLP 441
- Producer: Orrin Keepnews

Mark Murphy chronology
Rah! (1961)	That's How I Love the Blues! (1963)	Swingin' Singin' Affair (1965)

That's How I Love the Blues! is an album by American jazz vocalist Mark Murphy featuring tracks recorded in late 1962 for the Riverside label.

== Reception ==
Professional ratings
Review scores
Source	Rating
AllMusic	4.5/5 stars
The Rolling Stone Jazz Record Guide	3/5 stars
The Penguin Guide to Jazz Recordings	3/4 stars
DownBeat	4.5/5 stars
MusicHound Jazz	5/5 stars

AllMusic awarded the album 4½ stars with the review by Scott Yanow stating, "Murphy is in top early form".

DownBeat awarded the album 4.5 stars. Don Nelsen, reviewing the album said, "What makes Murphy so impressive is his command of diction, dynamics, nuance, time, and phrasing...Cohn’s arrangements and the band he recruited to back Murphy are first rate".

MusicHound Jazz awarded the album 5 bones. Reviewer Andrew Gilbert calls the album "one of the widest ranging explorations of the blues ever put to record". He singles out the "hip hard bop" of "Senor Blues", the Kansas City blues of "Goin' to Chicago Blues", and show tunes "Blues in the Night" calling the charts by Al Cohn "as witty and deep as Murphy's singing, making this one of the era's essential vocal albums".

== Track listing ==
1. "Going to Chicago Blues" (Count Basie, Jimmy Rushing) – 4:14
2. "Señor Blues" (Horace Silver) – 2:27
3. "That's How I Love the Blues" (Ralph Blane, Hugh Martin) – 3:47
4. "Jelly Jelly Blues" (Billy Eckstine, Earl Hines) – 3:25
5. "(I'm Left with The) Blues in My Heart" (Benny Carter, Irving Mills) – 2:13
6. "Fiesta in Blue" (Benny Goodman, Jon Hendricks, Dave Lambert, Jimmy Mundy) – 3:13
7. "Rusty Dusty Blues" (J. Mayo Williams) – 2:05
8. "Blues in the Night" (Harold Arlen, Johnny Mercer) – 3:39
9. "The Meaning of the Blues" (Bobby Troup, Leah Worth) – 2:52
10. "Everybody's Crazy 'Bout the Doggone Blues" (Henry Creamer, Turner Layton) – 2:25
11. "Blues, You're the Mother of Sin" (Billy Eckstine, Sid Kuller) – 3:19
12. "Wee Baby Blues" (Pete Johnson, Big Joe Turner) – 5:17

== Personnel ==
- Mark Murphy – vocals
- Clark Terry, Nick Travis, Snooky Young – trumpet
- Roger Kellaway – piano
- Dick Hyman, Bernie Leighton – organ
- Jim Hall – guitar
- Ben Tucker – bass
- Dave Bailey – drums
- Willie Rodriguez – congas, timpani
- Al Cohn – arranger
