= Rah (Mark Murphy album) =

Studio album by Mark Murphy
- Released: 1961
- Recorded: September & October, 1961
- Genre: Vocal jazz
- Length: 35:39
- Label: Riverside
- Producer: Orrin Keepnews

Mark Murphy chronology
Playing the Field (1960)	Rah (1961)	That's How I Love the Blues! (1962)

Rah is a 1961 studio album by Mark Murphy, arranged by Ernie Wilkins.

This was Murphy's first Riverside Records album, and he is supported by an orchestra including Bill Evans, Wynton Kelly, Urbie Green, Ernie Royal, Clark Terry and Jimmy Cobb.

== Reception ==
Professional ratings
Review scores
Source	Rating
Down Beat	4.5/5 stars
Allmusic	4/5 stars
The Rolling Stone Jazz Record Guide	3/5 stars
The Penguin Guide to Jazz Recordings	3.5/4 stars
MusicHound Jazz	5/5 stars

Down Beat magazine critic John A. Tynan reviewed the album for the April 12, 1962 issue and stated: "Murphy should thank his lucky stars for, among other things such as his talent, Ernie Wilkins. Wilkins has written a set of arrangements for the young jazz singer that should turn Frank Sinatra green with envy. Much of the album's success is due to the arranger's pen.

The Allmusic review by Eugene Chadbourne awarded the album four stars and said that Rah "has worn well over the years...On tracks such as "Green Dolphin Street," he dives into the rhythm with the relaxed calm of an expert. And when the result can be the harebrained complexity of "Twisted" or the funky timing of "Doodlin'," the wisdom of letting the experts handle the hard work has never been more apparent"

The original version of "My Favourite Things" on the session featured hip lyrics, including lines like "Ol' Ernie Wilkins he sure gives you wings", but these new lyrics were deemed inappropriate by composer Richard Rodgers and as a result Riverside Records/Mark Murphy were asked to substitute a 'straight' shorter version of it, but with the same arrangement. Another track left off the original album is "I'll Be Seeing You" for much the same reason. These original versions (still available in Japan) have become a collector's piece.

In the entry for Mark Murphy in MusicHound Jazz: The Essential Album Guide, Andrew Gilbert calls Rah! Murphy's "breakthrough album", a "classic session" with "a heartbreaking version of "Angel Eyes", a "definitive" "Doodlin'," "and a roller coaster version of Miles Davis's "Milestones", with Murphy "surrounded by players who know how to swing". The album is assigned 5 bones.

== Track listing ==
1. "Angel Eyes" (Earl Brent, Matt Dennis) – 3:12
2. "On Green Dolphin Street" (Bronislaw Kaper, Ned Washington) – 3:44
3. "Stoppin' the Clock" (Kral, Fran Landesman) – 3:10
4. "Spring Can Really Hang You up the Most" (Landesman, Tommy Wolf) – 3:49
5. "No Tears for Me" (Huddleston, McIntyre) – 3:12
6. "Out of This World" (Harold Arlen, Johnny Mercer) – 4:50
7. "Milestones" (Miles Davis) – 2:30
8. "My Favorite Things" (Oscar Hammerstein II, Richard Rodgers) – 2:17
9. "Doodlin'" (Horace Silver) – 3:30
10. "Li'l Darlin'" (Neal Hefti, Jon Hendricks) – 5:01
11. "Twisted" (Wardell Gray, Annie Ross) – 2:25
12. "I'll Be Seeing You" (only on Milestones 6064) – 2:01
13. "My Favorite Things" (Long AND short version- only on Milestones 6064) – 2:56 & 2:13
14. "It's Like Love" (only on Dutch pressing) – 2:32 (Arranged by Al Cohn)

== Personnel ==
- Mark Murphy – vocals
- Clark Terry, Blue Mitchell, Joe Wilder, Bernie Glow or Ernie Royal – trumpet
- Jimmy Cleveland, Urbie Green or Melba Liston – trombone
- Wynton Kelly or Bill Evans – piano
- Barry Galbraith or Sam Herman – guitar
- George Duvivier or Art Davis – double bass
- Jimmy Cobb – drums
- Ray Barretto – congas
- Ernie Wilkins – arranger, conductor

== Production ==
- Orrin Keepnews – producer
- Ray Fowler – engineer
- Ira Gitler – liner notes
- Ken Deardoff – design
- Phil DeLancie – digital remastering
