= Bop for Miles =

Live album by Mark Murphy
- Released: 2004
- Recorded: October 10, July 30, 1990, Vienna
- Genre: Vocal jazz
- Length: 37:02
- Label: HighNote
- Producer: Joe Fields

Mark Murphy chronology
Memories of You (2003)	Bop for Miles (2004)	Dim the Lights (2004)

Bop for Miles is 2004 live album by Mark Murphy, recorded in tribute to trumpeter Miles Davis.

Recorded live in Vienna in 1990, the final track, "Miles", was recorded in 1999.

== Reception ==
Professional ratings
Review scores
Source	Rating
AllMusic	3.5/5 stars
The Penguin Guide to Jazz Recordings	3/4 stars

The AllMusic review by Thom Jurek states: "As is typical of Murphy, his readings of these tunes are seminal. His attention to color and nuance in a ballad like 'Summertime' is just plain canny: he seems to coax the emotion out of the tune from underneath it, from someplace it was hidden away from view. As Murphy seamlessly changes tempos, keys, and vocal styles without blinking, the poetry gives way to burning scat and improv. A live gig by a master, this is worth seeking out."

Richard Cook and Brian Morton assign a 3 star rating in The Penguin Guide to Jazz Recordings and call the mix of Davis originals and Davis-associated standards "something of the feel of a sought-after live bootleg". The review singles out the opening of "On Green Dolphin Street" as "an a cappella tour de force from the singer".

Christopher Louden highly praised the album in his JazzTimes review. He called the album a "sublime treat. Recorded live in Vienna in 1990 these 10 tracks capture Murphy - not only jazz’s greatest male jazz singer of the past half - century but also its most intelligent, articulate, imaginative innovator - at his free-form finest".

== Track listing ==
1. "All Blues" (Miles Davis) - 6:44
2. "Summertime" (George Gershwin, Ira Gershwin, DuBose Heyward) - 4:08
3. "Autumn Leaves" (Joseph Kosma, Johnny Mercer, Jacques Prévert) - 3:35
4. "Bye Bye Blackbird" (Mort Dixon, Ray Henderson) - 6:03
5. "On Green Dolphin Street" (Bronislaw Kaper, Ned Washington) - 7:22
6. "My Ship" (I. Gershwin, Kurt Weill) - 3:10
7. "Farmer's Market" (Art Farmer, Annie Ross) - 7:30
8. "Goodbye Pork Pie Hat" (Charles Mingus) - 5:01
9. "Parker's Mood" (Charlie Parker) - 5:48
10. "Milestones" (Davis) - 5:25
11. "Miles" (Mark Murphy) - 2:59

== Personnel ==
- Mark Murphy - vocals, arranger
- Achim Tang - double bass
- Peter Mihelich - piano
- Allan Praskin - saxophone
- Vito Lesczak - drums

Production

- Katherine Miller - engineer
- Joe Fields - producer
- Ira Yuspeh - engineer
- Bill Milkowski - liner notes
