= Put the Blame on Mame =

Song by Allan Roberts and Doris Fisher

Single by Cass Daley with Vic Schoen and His Orchestra
- B-side: "The Truth of the Matter Is"
- Published: 1946
- Released: June 1946
- Recorded: April 5, 1946
- Studio: Decca Recording Studio, Hollywood
- Genre: Traditional pop
- Label: Decca
- Composer: Doris Fisher
- Lyricist: Allan Roberts

"Put the Blame on Mame" is a song by Allan Roberts and Doris Fisher, originally written for the film noir Gilda (1946) in which it was sung by the titular character, played by Rita Hayworth with the singing voice of Anita Kert Ellis dubbed in.

In keeping with the film character Gilda being "the ultimate femme fatale", the song sung by her in two scenes facetiously credits the amorous activities of a woman named "Mame" as the true cause of three well-known cataclysmic events in American history: The Great Chicago Fire of 1871, the Great Blizzard of 1888 in New York City and the 1906 San Francisco earthquake. Mame is also credited with causing the fictional shooting of Dan McGrew during the Yukon Gold Rush, an event derived from a short narrative poem published in 1907 by Robert W. Service.

The song was later reprised as an instrumental version in another noir film, 1953's The Big Heat, when Gilda star Glenn Ford first meets Lee Marvin's character in a bar. It is again played in 1954's Human Desire, also starring Glenn Ford. But even in 1946, the year it was released, the song was employed in the B-movie Columbia release The Secret of the Whistler when the protagonist (played by series lead Richard Dix) meets the femme fatale.

It was played in the Lucille Ball film The Fuller Brush Girl. Debra also sang it in the Everybody Loves Raymond episode "Debra at the Lodge".

It was later also recorded by:

- Gypsy Rose Lee in the movie Screaming Mimi
- Gale Robbins in the movie The Fuller Brush Girl
- Nat Gonella & His Georgians
- Barbara Hale in the movie The Houston Story
- Liane Foly
- John Williams and His Orchestra
- Somethin' Smith and the Redheads
- Mark Murphy
- Nancy Murphy

A clip of Hayworth singing the song in Gilda was to be included in Michael Jackson's performance of "Smooth Criminal" in the planned show This Is It; the song was included in the posthumously released film version.

The song is featured in the 2024 DC Studios miniseries The Penguin, a spin-off of the 2022 film The Batman. A clip of Hayworth's performance of the song is featured in the first episode, "After Hours", and the song is used again in the sixth episode, "Gold Summit", with protagonist Oz Cobb (Colin Farrell) comparing his elderly, dementia-ridden mother to Gilda.

In 2004, "Put the Blame on Mame" finished #84 in AFI's 100 Years...100 Songs survey of the top tunes in American cinema.
