= Love Is What Stays =

Studio album by Mark Murphy
- Released: January 29, 2007
- Recorded: 2007
- Genre: Vocal jazz
- Length: 37:02
- Label: Verve
- Producer: Till Brönner, Nan Schwartz

Mark Murphy chronology
Once to Every Heart (2003)	Love Is What Stays (2007)	Never Let Me Go (2010)

Love Is What Stays is a 2007 studio album by Mark Murphy, arranged by Nan Schwartz and Till Brönner.

For Murphy's second Verve album, he is accompanied by figures including Lee Konitz, Don Grusin, the Deutsches Symphonie-Orchester Berlin, Chuck Loeb and Sebastian Merk.

== Reception ==
Professional ratings
Review scores
Source	Rating
AllMusic	4/5 stars
The Penguin Guide to Jazz Recordings	3.5/4 stars

The AllMusic review by Thom Jurek awarded the album four stars and said that Love Is What Stays "is a deeply satisfying and, in places, even astonishing reflection on time and its passage. Memory, reverie, regrets, victories, hipster mysticism, and wonderfully canny theatrically poetic wordplay all come to bear in these songs. It is more adventurous and downright wily in its aims than anyone could have hoped for." Jurek says that music fans looking "for true authenticity and artfully made American popular music, should snap this up as quickly as possible. Time will be the judge, but Love Is What Stays may become a Murphy masterpiece and - let's face it - the man embodies the very essence of "hip." And always will."

The Penguin Guide to Jazz Recordings review assigns a rating of ***(*), meaning "an excellent record, with some exceptional music" which is "only kept out of the front rank by some minor reservations". Richard Cook calls Murphy's performances "clever, worldly wise, emotionally unguarded singing of a very high order", but says, "The only reason to dislike it is that the band sounds cold and not as smart as the boss".

Christopher Louden praised the album in his JazzTimes review. He wrote, "Musically speaking, Mark Murphy couldn’t misstep in a minefield on a moonless night. Throughout his half-century progression from startlingly innovative hipster to sage elder statesman, Murphy has never stumbled, never faltered and never failed to continuously raise the bar for every jazz vocalist in the business . . . the vocal vigor and elasticity of his youth may be gone, but the weather-beaten weariness that now replaces them is just as artful and enticing".

== Track listing ==
1. "Stolen Moments" (Mark Murphy, Oliver Nelson) - 2:40
2. "Angel Eyes" (Earl Brent, Matt Dennis) - 8:06
3. "My Foolish Heart" (Ned Washington, Victor Young) - 5:14
4. "So Doggone Lonesome" (Johnny Cash) - 4:51
5. "What If" (Guy Berryman, Jonny Buckland, Will Champion, Chris Martin) - 7:18
6. "The Interview" (Murphy) - 5:41
7. "Once Upon a Summertime" (Eddie Barclay, Michel Legrand, Eddy Marnay, Johnny Mercer) - 5:33
8. "Stolen Moments (1st Reprise)" - 1:03
9. "Love Is What Stays" (Till Brönner, Murphy) - 6:41
10. "Stolen Moments (2nd Reprise)" - 1:22
11. "Too Late Now" (Burton Lane, Alan Jay Lerner) - 7:54
12. "Blue Cell Phone" (Murphy) - 3:04
13. "Did I Ever Really Live" (Albert Hague, Allan Sherman) - 4:39

== Personnel ==
Performance

- Mark Murphy - vocals, arranger
- Arne Schuhmann - accordion, horn engineer, mixing, rhythm engineer, vocal engineer
- Christian VonKaphengst - arranger, double bass
- Till Brönner - arranger, brass, fender rhodes, flugelhorn, producer, rhythm arrangements, trumpet
- Nan Schwartz - arranger, conductor, orchestral arrangements, producer
- Frank Chastenier - arranger, piano
- Peter Pühn - double bass
- Gregor Schaetz
- Dávid Adorján - cello
- Claudia Benker
- Mathias Donderer
- Andreas Grünkorn
- Andreas Lichtschlag
- Adele Schneider Bitter
- Gregoire Peters - bass clarinet, flute, tenor saxophone
- Matthias Schorn - clarinet
- Joachim Welz
- Sebastian Merk - drums
- Don Grusin - fender rhodes
- Kornelia Brandkamp - flute
- Frauke Leopold
- Frauke Ross
- Raphael Weidlich
- Christian Auer - french horn
- Ozan Cakar
- Markus Maskunitty
- Sarah Christ - harp
- Jürgen Hollerbuhl - oboe
- Maximilian Baillie - viola
- Anna Bortolin
- Leo Klepper
- Atsuko Matsuzaki
- Annemarie Moorcroft
- Raphael Sachs
- Dieter Vogt
- Verena Wehling
- Mika Bamba - violin
- Stefan Bitto
- Nari Brandner
- Elsa Brown
- Tarla Grau
- Thomas Grote
- Isabel Grunkorn
- Bertram Hartling
- Marija Jeremic
- Maxim Kosinov
- Clemens Linder
- Franziska Mantel
- Thomas Otto
- Vladislav Polyalkovsky
- Paulina Quandt Marttila
- Ingrid Schliephake
- Andreas Schumann
- Sandra Tancibudek
- Rüdiger Thal
- Karsten Windt
- Ksenija Zecevic
- Kai Brückner - guitar
- Johan Leijonhufvud
- Chuck Loeb
- Karl Schloz
- Torsten Maaß - rhythm arrangements
- Christian Von Der Goltz
- Lee Konitz - alto saxophone
- Peter Weniger - soprano saxophone, tenor saxophone

Production

- James Gavin - liner notes
- Bernie Grundman - mastering
- Lisa Hansen - release coordinator
- Cameron Mizell
- John Newcott
- Mitja Arzensek - artwork, photography
- Tobias Lehmann - engineer
