= This Could Be the Start of Something =

Popular song by composer Steve Allen

Song by Steve Allen
- Written: 1954
- Published: 1956
- Genre: jazz
- Length: 2:02
- Label: Coral
- Songwriter: Steve Allen

"This Could Be the Start of Something" (generally known as "This Could Be the Start of Something Big") is a popular song by Steve Allen, published in 1956.

== Background ==
Originally, the song was written as part of the score for the 1954 television musical production of The Bachelor. This score earned Allen a Sylvania Award (awarded "For Outstanding Contribution to Creative Television Technique").

In 1956, "This Could be the Start of Something" replaced the original opening theme to Allen's NBC talk show, Tonight Starring Steve Allen, until Allen left the show in 1957 to be replaced by Jack Paar. It became something of a personal theme song for him, being used as the opening to his other talk and variety shows, as well as during the opening of both the CBS and syndicated versions of I've Got a Secret during his time as host.

== Cover versions ==
A number of performers have covered this song, including:

- Count Basie
- Tony Bennett
- Bobby Darin
- Ella Fitzgerald
- Aretha Franklin
- Judy Garland
- Grant Green
- Lionel Hampton
- J. J. Johnson and Kai Winding
- Jack Jones
- Peggy Lee
- Mark Murphy
- Oscar Peterson
- Nelson Riddle
- The Ray Charles Singers
- Steve and Eydie
- Pia Zadora performed the song as a dance number at the Oscars ceremony in Naked Gun 33⅓: The Final Insult.
- Lawrence Welk covered this song in his program's New Year's Eve show of 1970.
- Seth MacFarlane and Elizabeth Gillies
