= Mark Murphy (singer) =

American jazz singer (1932–2015)

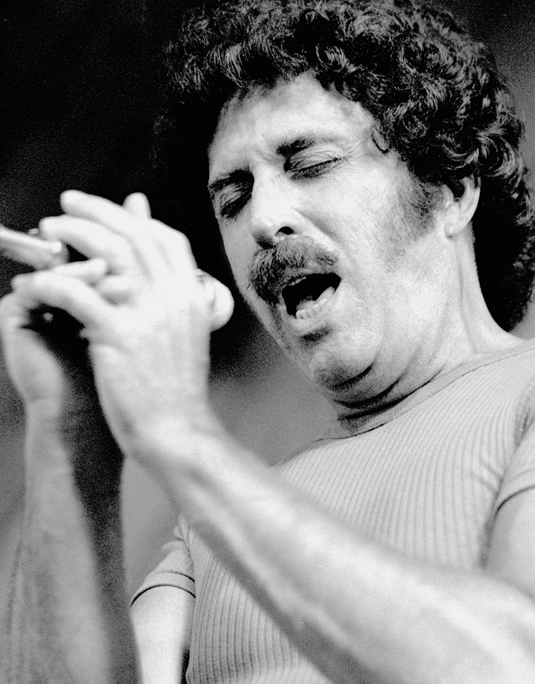
- Murphy sings at Bach Dancing & Dynamite Society in Half Moon Bay, California on August 3, 1980

Background information
- Born: Mark Howe Murphy; March 14, 1932; Syracuse, New York, U.S.
- Died: October 22, 2015 (aged 83) Englewood, New Jersey, U.S.
- Genre: Vocal jazz
- Occupation: Singer
- Years active: 1956–2013
- Labels: Decca, Capitol, Riverside, Fontana, Muse, HighNote, Verve

Mark Howe Murphy (March 14, 1932 – October 22, 2015) was an American jazz singer based at various times in New York City, Los Angeles, London, and San Francisco. He recorded 51 albums under his own name during his lifetime and was principally known for his innovative vocal improvisations. He was the recipient of the 1996, 1997, 2000, and 2001 Down Beat magazine readers' jazz poll for Best Male Vocalist and was also nominated five times for the Grammy Award for Best Vocal Jazz Performance. He wrote lyrics to the jazz tunes "Stolen Moments" and "Red Clay".

== Early life ==
Born in Syracuse, New York, in 1932, Murphy was raised in a musical family, his parents having met when his father was appointed director of the local Methodist Church choir. He grew up in the nearby small town of Fulton, New York, where his grandmother and then his aunt were the church organists. Opera was also a presence in the Murphy home. He started piano lessons at the age of seven.

In his teens, Murphy joined his brother Dwight's jazz dance band as the singer (and occasional pianist), influenced by Peggy Lee, Nat "King" Cole, June Christy, Anita O'Day, and Ella Fitzgerald. The Jazz pianist Art Tatum was another early influence.

Murphy graduated from Syracuse University in 1953, having majored in Music and Drama. While there he was spotted singing at the Embassy Club by Sammy Davis Jr, who invited him to perform a guest spot at his own gig shortly afterwards, and put him in touch with TV host Steve Allen.

The following year Murphy moved to New York City, taking part-time jobs as he looked for work as an actor and singer. He appeared in productions for the Gilbert and Sullivan Light Opera Company and a musical version for television of Casey at the Bat. He also twice took second place at Apollo Theatre amateur singing contests.

== The first albums ==
Murphy was eventually introduced to record producer Milt Gabler, who was an artist and repertoire director (A&R) for Decca. His resulting debut recording was Meet Mark Murphy (1956), followed closely by Let Yourself Go (1957).

After disappointing album sales, Murphy moved to Los Angeles in 1958. While in the city, he recorded three albums for Capitol Records, and had a minor hit single with "This Could Be the Start of Something". This was not enough for him to be retained by Capitol, however, so he returned to New York in the early '60s. Here he recorded two albums for Riverside Records: the album Rah (1961) included "Angel Eyes", a version of Horace Silver's "Doodlin'", and "Green Dolphin Street", featuring Bill Evans, Clark Terry, Urbie Green, Blue Mitchell and Wynton Kelly as accompanists. His favorite recording to date, That's How I Love the Blues, soon followed. In 1963, Murphy hit the charts across the country with his single of "Fly Me to the Moon" and was voted New Star of the Year in Down Beat Magazine's Reader's Poll. Around this time he fell under the spell of Miles Davis; for the rest of his career, Murphy maintained that he tried as far as possible to sing like Miles played.

== London ==
In 1963, Murphy moved to London, England, where he quickly found acceptance and played frequently at Ronnie Scott's Club, as well as making regular appearances on BBC Radio. He recorded three more albums in London, and one in Germany that is among his best - Midnight Mood (1968). From London he made frequent trips to Holland, where he worked on Dutch radio, mainly with producer Joop de Roo. Between 1964 and 1972, he acted in a number of drama productions for TV and radio, and appeared as a singer in the 1967 British comedy film Just Like a Woman. Meanwhile, he continued to cultivate his jazz audiences in Europe, singing in clubs and on radio. It was in London that Murphy, who was gay, met his long-time partner Eddie O'Sullivan.

== The Muse years ==
He returned to the States in 1972 and began recording an average of an album per year for more than 14 years on the Muse label. These included the Grammy-nominated albums Satisfaction Guaranteed, Bop for Kerouac and Nat's Choice: Nat King Cole Songbook Vol. II. Murphy's other highly regarded Muse recordings include Bridging a Gap (featuring Ron Carter, Jimmy Madison, Randy Brecker and Michael Brecker), Mark Murphy Sings (again featuring the Brecker Brothers along with David Sanborn), Living Room, Beauty And the Beast and Stolen Moments. Bop for Kerouac (1981), with Richie Cole and Bill Mays, was a result of Murphy's enthusiasm for the writing of Jack Kerouac, whom Murphy regarded as a soul-mate. It included readings from the author's books On the Road and The Subterraneans. Murphy followed it up with Kerouac Then And Now, released in 1989. Having been a fan of Brazilian music since the late 1950s, in 1984 together with the band Viva Brasil he recorded the album Brazil Song (Cancões do Brasil), which featured work by Antonio Carlos Jobim and Milton Nascimento. He wrote lyrics for the title track, by Oliver Nelson, of his Stolen Moments album, and it quickly became a radio favourite, remaining one of his most popular recordings.

== New directions ==
In 1987, Murphy continued his explorations of Brazilian music by recording Night Mood, an album of songs by composer Ivan Lins, followed by the Grammy-nominated September Ballads - both on Milestone Records.

In the UK, Murphy's recorded output gained a new lease of life in the mid-Eighties during the acid jazz dance craze. DJ's, principally Gilles Peterson, played his bop and Latin recordings at club nights, creating a new generation of Mark Murphy fans. He continued to work extensively in Europe, recording in Germany, Holland, Austria, England, Italy, France, Sweden, Denmark and Slovenia, often as a guest artist. Murphy also appeared on UFO's last two releases (for Polydor Records), in which he wrote and rapped lyrics on songs composed with the group. This collaboration opened up further new audiences in the acid-jazz and hip-hop genres, demonstrating jazz's timelessness while transcending generations and styles.

In August 1997, BMG/RCA Victor released Song for the Geese, for which he received his fifth and final Grammy nomination. In that same month, the 32 Records label released a double CD anthology Stolen and Other Moments, which features some of his recordings for the now defunct Muse label. The CD features material from the two "Kerouac" albums and a selection of "the best of Mark Murphy". It was followed by three further anthologies.

After Muse boss Joe Fields sold the label and set up HighNote Records in its place, Murphy recorded five more albums for the new label, including Some Time Ago (2000), Links (2001) and Memories of You (2003).

Murphy's release Once to Every Heart (2005) on Verve, features sensuous ballads, where the listener can hear him singing at the top of his form, with an orchestra arranged by Nan Schwartz. It was one of the best-selling albums of Murphy's career. In 2007 Verve released Love is What Stays. Both albums were produced by German trumpeter Till Brönner.

Murphy also collaborated with Tenth & Parker, a modern UK electronica/acid jazz group on their Twenty:Twelve (2001) album; plus the Five Corners Quintet, a modern Finnish jazz band, appearing on their albums Chasin' the Jazz Gone By (2005) and Hot Corner (2008).

In 2010, he released the independently produced CD, Never Let Me Go, accompanied by pianist Misha Piatigorsky, bassist Danton Boller and drummer Chris Wabich. The CD contains all songs he selected, mostly ballads, and was the first time he recorded Bill Evans' "Turn Out The Stars".

Murphy also participated as a guest on The Royal Bopsters Project by Amy London, Darmon Meader, Dylan Pramuk, and Holli Ross, recorded in 2012 and released in 2015 by Motema Music. His final recording was a limited edition EP/MP3, A Beautiful Friendship: Remembering Shirley Horn on Gearbox Records, released in 2013.

Murphy continued to tour internationally into his 80s, appearing at festivals and concerts, in jazz clubs and on television programs, throughout the U.S., Europe, Australia and Japan and elsewhere. John Bush at AllMusic.com described Murphy as "a major name in vocal jazz." A longtime resident of the Lillian Booth Actors Home in Englewood, New Jersey, he died there on October 22, 2015.

Mark Murphy was the first recipient of the "Words and Music Award" presented by the Jazz Foundation of America with the Jazz Journalists Association at the 2009 Jazz Awards, at the Jazz Standard (NYC) on June 16, 2009.

== Discography ==
=== As leader ===
- 1956 Meet Mark Murphy (Decca)
- 1957 Let Yourself Go (Decca)
- 1959 This Could Be the Start of Something (Capitol)
- 1960 Mark Murphy's Hip Parade (Capitol)
- 1960 Playing the Field (Capitol)
- 1961 Rah (Riverside)
- 1962 That's How I Love the Blues! (Riverside)
- 1965 Swingin' Singin' Affair (Fontana)
- 1966 Who Can I Turn To & 11 Other Great Standards (Immediate)
- 1968 Midnight Mood (Saba)
- 1970 This Must Be Earth (Phoenix)
- 1972 Bridging a Gap (Muse)
- 1973 Mark II (Muse)
- 1975 Mark Murphy Sings...On the Red Clay, Naima and Other Great Songs (Muse)
- 1977 Mark Murphy Sings Mostly Dorothy Fields & Cy Coleman (Audiophile)
- 1978 Stolen Moments (Muse)
- 1979 Satisfaction Guaranteed (Muse)
- 1981 Bop for Kerouac (Muse)
- 1982 The Artistry of Mark Murphy (Muse)
- 1983 Brazil Song (Cancões Do Brasil) (Muse)
- 1983 Mark Murphy Sings the Nat "King" Cole Songbook, Volume One (Muse)
- 1983 Mark Murphy Sings Nat's Choice: The Nat "King" Cole Songbook, Volume Two (Muse)
- 1984 Living Room (Muse)
- 1986 Beauty and the Beast (Muse)
- 1987 Night Mood: The Music of Ivan Lins (Milestone)
- 1988 September Ballads (Milestone)
- 1989 Kerouac, Then and Now (Muse)
- 1990 What a Way to Go (Muse)
- 1991 I'll Close My Eyes (Muse)
- 1991 One for Junior (Muse)
- 1993 Very Early (West and East Music)
- 1993 Just Jazz (Jazzette)
- 1995 The Dream (Jive)
- 1996 Shadows (TCB Music)
- 1996 North Sea Jazz Sessions, Volume 5 (Jazz World)
- 1997 Song for the Geese (RCA Victor)
- 1999 Some Time Ago (HighNote)
- 2000 The Latin Porter (Go Jazz)
- 2000 Links (HighNote)
- 2001 Lucky to Be Me (HighNote)
- 2003 Memories of You: Remembering Joe Williams (HighNote)
- 2004 Bop for Miles (HighNote)
- 2004 Dim the Lights (Millennium)
- 2005 Once to Every Heart (Verve)
- 2006 Love Is What Stays (Verve)
- 2010 Never Let Me Go (Mark Murphy Productions)
- 2013 A Beautiful Friendship: Remembering Shirley Horn (Gearbox)
- 2013 Another Vision (Edel)
- 2016 Live In Athens, Greece (Harbinger)
- 2016 Live In Italy 2001 (Splasch)
- 2017 Wild and Free: Live at the Keystone Korner (HighNote)
- 2026 Live at Club 43 April 23, 1966 (Jazz Rewind)

==== Compilations ====
- 1983 Mark Murphy Sings Nat's Choice The Complete Nat "King" Cole Songbook Volumes 1 and 2 (Muse)
- 1992 Stolen...And Other Moments (32 Jazz)
- 1997 The Best of Mark Murphy (Blue Note/Capitol)
- 1998 Jazz Standards (32 Jazz)
- 1999 Songbook (32 Jazz)
- 1999 Crazy Rhythm: Debut Recordings (GRP)
- 1999 Mark Murphy Sings Nat King Cole & More (32 Jazz)
- 2000 Meet Mark Murphy [Compilation] (BMG International)
- 2003 Timeless (Savoy Jazz)
- 2004 Giants of Jazz: Mark Murphy (Savoy Jazz)
- 2006 Mark Murphy's Hip Parade/Playing the Field (DRG)
- 2010 Mark Murphy · Orchestra Conducted & Arranged by Bill Holman (Fresh Sound Records)
- 2013 The Complete Decca Recordings (Fresh Sound Records)
- 2014 Playing the Field/Rah/That's How I Love the Blues! (Fresh Sound Records)
- 2016 The Jazz Singer: Anthology - Muse Years 1973-1991 (Soul Brother Records)
- 2017 Milestones (Not Now Music)

== Guest appearances ==
With Candoli Brothers

- 1958 "That Old Black Magic"/"Body and Soul" – from Sessions Live (Calliope)

With Al Cohn

- 1962 "Like Love"/"Fly Away My Sadness" – from Everybody's Doin' the Bossa Nova (Riverside) and The Very Best of Latin Jazz (Not Now Music)

With Herb Geller

- 1975 "Sudden Senility"/"The Power of a Smile"/"Space A La Mode" – from "An American in Hamburg/ The View From Here" (Tramp Records)

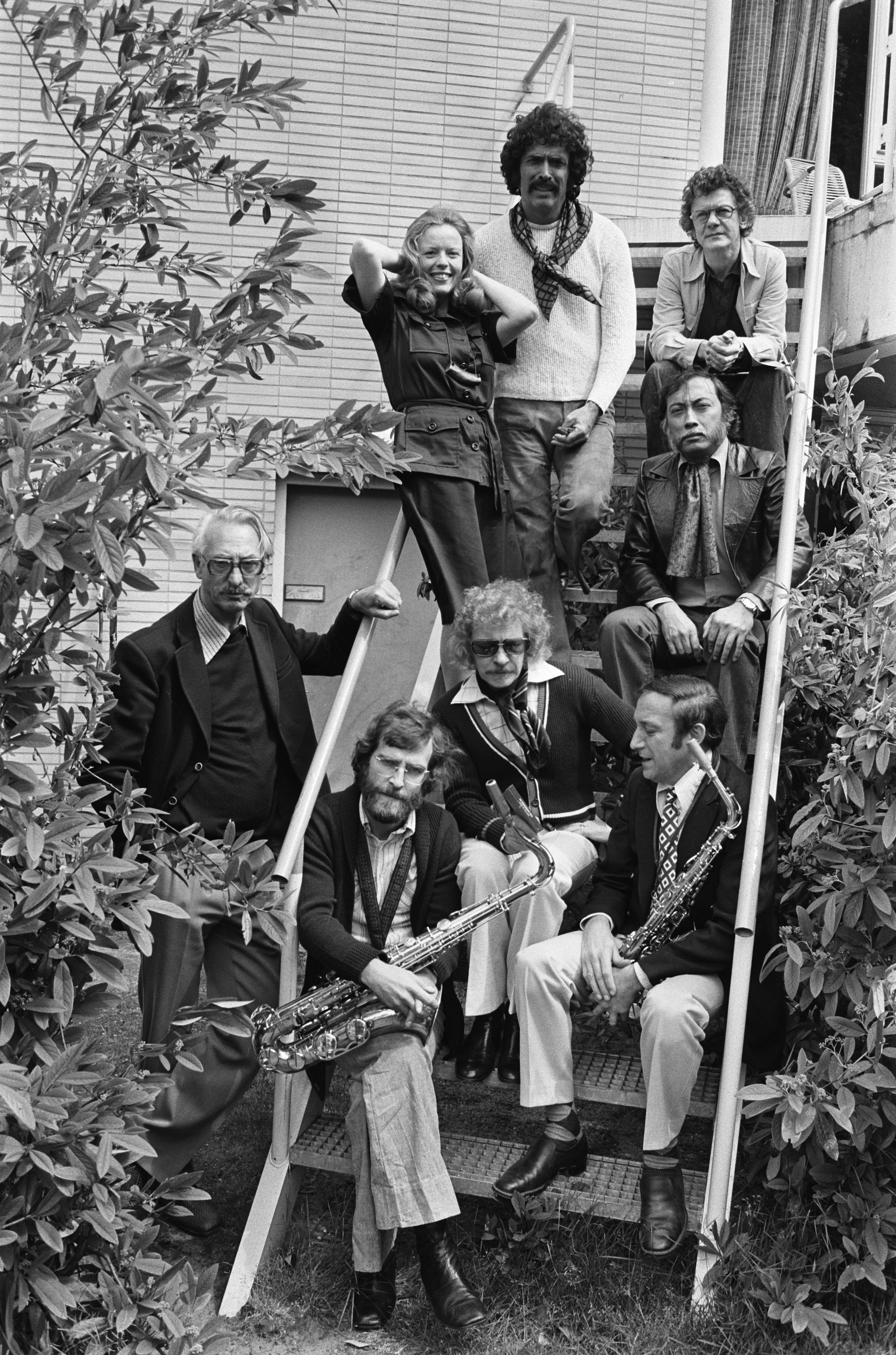
5 June 1975. Greetje Kauffeld, Mark Murphy, Ack van Rooyen, Rob Pronk, Dolf van der Linden, Ferdinand Povel, Jerry van Rooyen, Piet Noordijk

With Metropole Orchestra

- 1975 "Out of This World"/"Get Happy (with Greetje Kauffeld)"/"Come Rain or Come Shine"/"Let's Fall in Love (with Greetje Kauffeld)"/"My Shining Hour (with Greetje Kauffeld)"/"Blues in the Night"/"Between the Devil and the Deep Blue Sea (with Greetie Kauffeld)"/"Medley: This Time the Dream's on Me/Ill Wind"(with Greetie Kauffeld)"/"Last Night When We Were Young"/"I've Got the World on a String"/"That Old Black Magic (with Greetje Kauffeld)" – from Plays the Music of Harold Arlen (Sonorama) and also on Metro`s Midnight Music (Dutch Radio Jazz 1970-75) (Sonorama) tracks recorded from the Dutch NOS Radio Show 1970–75.

With College of the Siskiyous Choir

- 1980 "A Tribute to Duke (Solitude)"/"Stolen Moments" – from College of the Siskiyous Choir with Guest Artist Mark Murphy (KM)

With Jeff Hamilton Quintet

- 1982 "Split Season Blues" – from Indiana (Concord)

With Blossom Dearie

- 1985 "Love Dance" – from Chez Walberg Part One, Vol. 9 (Daffodil)

With Ann Burton

- 1987 "Medley: Moments LikeThis/My Buddy"/"I Wish I Were in Love Again" – from That's AlI (Blue Jack)

With Madeline Eastman

- 1991 "You're the Dangerous Type" – from Mad About Madeline! (Mad Kat)

With Balcony Big Band

- 1992 "I Concentrate on You"/"My Romance"/"You Don't Know What Love Is" – from Seasoned To Taste (Corona Music)

With MHS Big Band

- 1992 "Don't get Around Much Anymore"/"Detour Ahead" – from Klangdebuts (MHS)

With George Gruntz

- 1992 Cosmopolitan Greetings (Musikszene Schweiz)
- 2004 The Magic of a Flute (Musiques Suisses)

With Guido Di Leone

- 1994 "Like Someone in Love"/"The Nearness of You" – from Hearing a Rhapsody (ModernTimes)

With Fred Hersch

- 1994 "Last Night When We Were Young" – Last Night When We Were Young: The Ballad Album (Classical Action)

With United Future Organization

- 1994 "Future Light" – from No Sound is Too Taboo (Talkin' Loud)
- 1995 "Stolen Moments (UFO Remix)" – from United Future Airlines (Talkin' Loud)

With The Baker Boys

- 1995 "Angel Eyes"/"Bye Bye Blackbird" – from Facin' Our Time (Sittel)

With Edouard Ferlet

- 1996 "Kdo en poins au nez (Sweet Poison)" – from Escale (Quoi de Neuf Doctor)

With Rinaldo Donati

- 1996 "Nata"/"Jardim Botanico (Oceanico)"/"Nos Otros Tambem"/"Aguaviva" – from Jardim Botanico Oceanico (Maxine)

With Fernando Correa

- 1996 "Where Could Love Have Gone?"/"Time Al Gone"/"Lilianne" – from Em Contraste (LiCord Music)

With Ellen Hoffman

- 1998 "Day Dream" – from Daydreams

With Barbra Sfraga

- 1998 "I'lI Call You" – from Oh, What a Thrill (Naxos Jazz)

With Tenth and Parker

- 2000 "Kool Down" – from Kool Down (Disorient Sushi)
- 2001 "Millennium Riddle Song" – from Millennium Riddle Song (Disorient Sushi)

With 4hero

- 2001 "Twelve Tribes" – from Creating Patterns (Talkin' Loud)

With United Future Organization

- 2002 "No Problem" – from V (Exceptional)

With Jan Lundgren

- 2002 "What Makes the Sunset"/"The Things We did Last Summer" – from Jan Lundgren Trio Plays the Music of Jule Styne (Sittel Records)

With Till Brönner

- 2002 "Dim the Lights" – from Blue Eyed Soul (Universal)

With Lindberg Hemmer Foundation

- 2003 "Little Things" – from Inside Scandinavia (Raw Fusion Recordings)

With Andy Hamill

- 2003 "The Planet Formerly Known as Moon"/"Love and Money Don't Mix" – from Bee for Bass (Emu)

With Ian Shaw

- 2003 "Soon as the Weather Breaks" – from A World Still Turning (441 Records)

With Brother K

- 2006 "The Subterraneans" – from Degeneration Beat (Cromo Music)

With The Five Corners Quintet

- 2005 "This Could Be the Start of Something"/"Before We Say Goodbye"/"Jamming (with Mr. Hoagland)" – from Chasin' the Jazz Gone By (Ricky-Tick Records)
- 2008 "Kerouac Days in Montana"/"Come and Get Me"/"Layers of Layers" – from Hot Corner (Ricky-Tick Records)

With Gill Manly

- 2009 "I Keep Goin' Back to Joe's" – from With a Song in My Heart (Linn)

With Guillaume de Chassy and Daniel Yvinec

- 2009 "I'll Walk Alone"/"Then I'll Be Tired of You"/"Taking a Chance on Love"/"I Wish You Love" – from Songs from the Last Century (Bee Jazz)

With London, Meader, Pramuk & Ross

- 2015 "Red Clay"/"Señor Blues"/"Boplicity"/"Bird Chasin'" – from The Royal Bopsters Project (Mótema)

With Various Artists:

- 1962 "Like Love"/"Fly Away My Sadness" – from Everybody's Doin' the Bossa Nova (Riverside) and The Very Best of Latin Jazz (Not Now Music)
- 1967 "Stompin' at the Savoy" – from Mezinárodni Jazzovy Praha 1967 (Suprafon, Gramofonovy Club)
- 1969 "CC Rider"/"Broadway" – from MPS JazzConcert '69 (Center)
- 1969 "Broadway" – from Polish Jazz Vol. 20 Jazz Jambore '69 - New Faces (Polskie Nagrania)
- 1991 "My Ship" – from BP Club All-Stars 1991 (Jazzette)
- 2000 "This Nearly Was Mine" – from Something Wonderful: Rodgers and Hammerstein Tribute Album (WHD Entertainment)

=== Radio ===
- 1990 Mark Murphy 1990 KJAZ See's Sunday Night
  - Live performance by singer Mark Murphy with the Larry Dunlap Trio at Yoshi's Nitespot in Oakland CA on 7/20/1990. Broadcast on KJAZ 92.7 FM in Alameda CA. This set was on the See's Sunday Night program, hosted by Bud Spangler. Musicians: Mark Murphy (vocals), Larry Dunlap (piano), David Belove (bass), Eddie Marshall (drums).
- 1998 "Mark Murphy On Piano Jazz" on NPR's Piano Jazz with Marian McPartland (piano) and Sean Smith (bass)
  - "Sometimes I'm Happy" / "What's New" / "Song For The Geese" / "Detour Ahead" / "I'll Remember April" / "Blues" (McPartland)

=== Videos ===
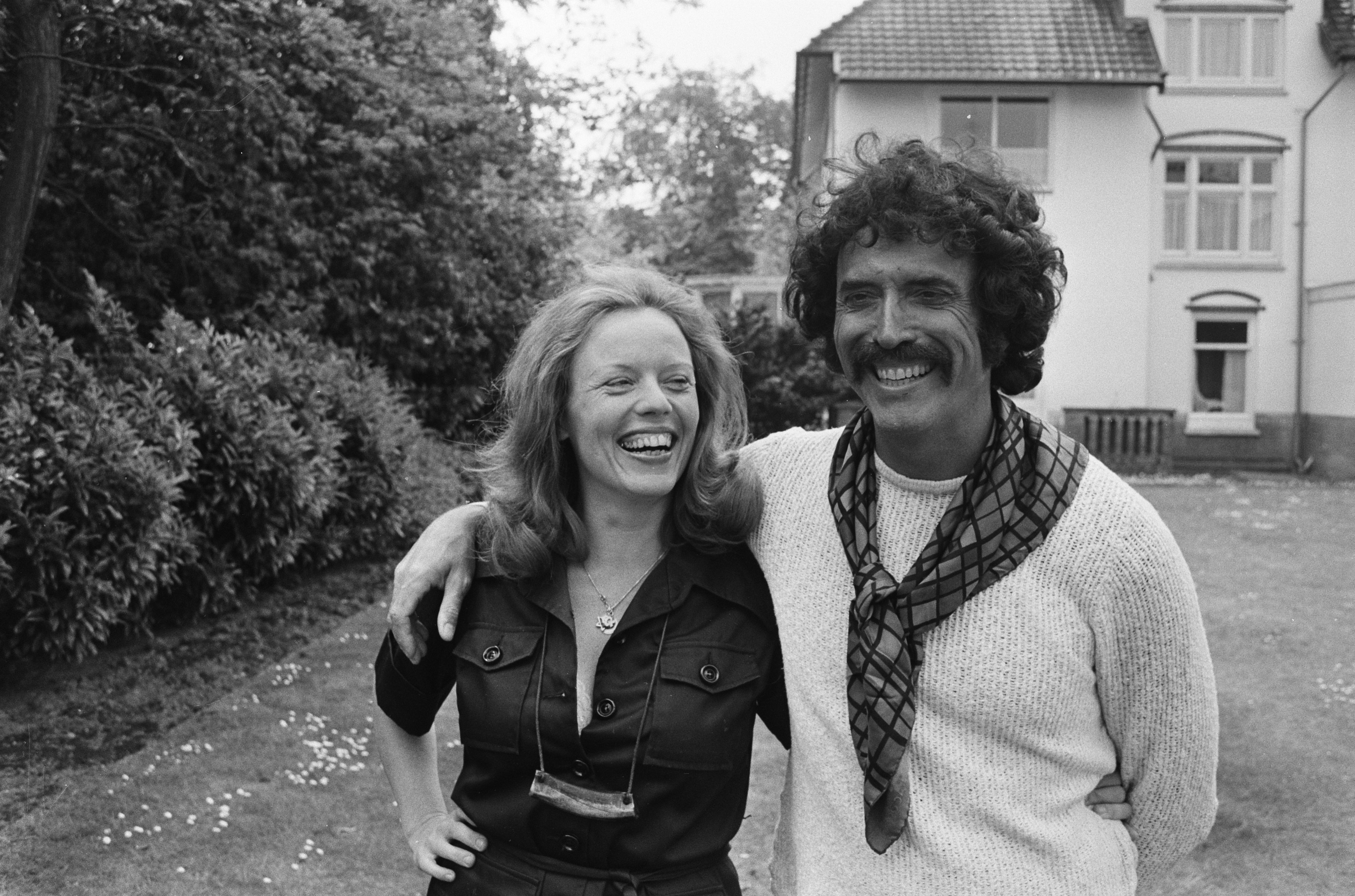
Greetje Kauffeld and Mark Murphy 1975. Photo by Rob Bogaerts

- 1958 Stars of Jazz TV series hosted by Bobby Troup.
  - Two episodes with Mark Murphy: UCLA Film Library.
  - One episode with Shelly Manne features Mark Murphy on JazzLegends DVD Papa Jo Jones and the Drum Stars.
- 1976 Mark Murphy, Greetje Kauffeld & Metropole Orchestra - Cole Porter Tribute
  - March 7, 1976 - Dutch Television VARA - Metro's Music – with Greetje Kauffeld (vocals), Piet Noordijk (alto saxophone), Ferdinand Povel (tenor saxophone), Ack van Rooyen (trumpet), Peter Ypma (drums), Jacques Schols (bass), Dick Schallies (piano), Metropole Orchestra, Dolf van der Linden (conductor)
  - "Every Time We Say Goodbye" / "You're the Top" / "I Am in Love"
- 1976 Mark Murphy, Greetje Kauffeld & Metropole Orchestra - Jule Styne Tribute
  - March 1976 - Dutch Television VARA - Metro's Music – with Greetje Kauffeld (vocals), Piet Noordijk (alto saxophone), Ferdinand Povel (tenor saxophone), Ack van Rooyen (trumpet), Peter Ypma (drums), Jacques Schols (bass), Dick Schallies (piano), Metropole Orchestra, Dolf van der Linden (conductor)
  - "Time After Time" / "The Charm of You" / "Let It Snow! "Let It Snow! Let It Snow!" / "Just in Time" / "I Guess I'll Hang My Tears Out to Dry"
- 1976 Mark Murphy, Greetje Kauffeld & Metropole Orchestra - Jimmy McHugh Tribute
  - April 4, 1976 - Dutch Television VARA - Metro's Music – with Greetje Kauffeld (vocals), Piet Noordijk (alto saxophone), Ferdinand Povel (tenor saxophone), Ack van Rooyen (trumpet), Peter Ypma (drums), Jacques Schols (bass), Dick Schallies (piano), Metropole Orchestra, Dolf van der Linden (conductor)
  - "When My Sugar Walks Down the Street" / "On the Sunny Side of the Street" / "Exactly Like You"
- 1981 Mark Murphy: Murphy's Mood – with Pete Candoli and Conte Candoli
  - From The Ad Lib Series, a TV series filmed in 1980 at the Charlie Chaplin Sound Stage in Hollywood and hosted by Phil Moore.
  - Season 1, Episode 45: Mark Murphy/Pete & Conte Condoli 1 aired in 1981
  - Murphy performs “You've Proven Your Point” and “Parker's Mood” backed by Bill Mays (piano), Marty Budwig (bass), Charles Harris (drums) and is interviewed by Phil Moore.
  - Available from ARKADIA CONCERTS.
- 1981 Mark Murphy: Echo - with Pete & Conte Candoli
  - From The Ad Lib Series, a TV series filmed in 1980 at the Charlie Chaplin Sound Stage in Hollywood and hosted by Phil Moore.
  - Season 1, Episode 46: Mark Murphy/Pete & Conte Condoli 2
  - Murphy performs “Again” and “Farmer's Market” backed by Bill Mays (piano), Marty Budwig (bass), Charles Harris (drums) and is interviewed by Phil Moore.
  - Available from ARKADIA CONCERTS.
- 2006 A Night with Mark Murphy by Brad Saville.
  - February 2006 performance at the Iridium Jazz Club on 51st and Broadway – with Misha Piatagorsky (piano), Hans Glavisim (bass), Gilad Dobrecky (percussion), and David Rokech (drums)
- 2008 Mark Murphy: Murphy's Mood – with Pete Candoli and Conte Candoli on DVD
