= Mark Murphy's Hip Parade =

1959 studio album by Mark Murphy

Studio album by Mark Murphy
- Released: 1960
- Recorded: 1959
- Studio: Capitol Studios
- Genre: Vocal jazz
- Length: 32:45
- Label: Capitol Records
- Producer: Tom Morgan

Mark Murphy chronology
This Could Be the Start of Something (1959)	Mark Murphy's Hip Parade (1960)	Playing the Field (1960)

Mark Murphy's Hip Parade is a studio album by Mark Murphy.

Mark Murphy's Hip Parade is the 4th album by American jazz vocalist Mark Murphy and his second for Capitol Records. It was recorded in 1959 when Murphy was 27 years old and released by the Capitol Records label in the United States in 1960. The album is a collection of pop tunes and standards performed with a jazz band.

== Background ==
Capitol Records producer Tom Morgan signed Murphy to a three-album contract when Murphy was on the West Coast in 1958 on the basis of the two albums he recorded for Milt Gabler of Decca Records. This release was his second album for Capitol.

== Recording ==
The arrangements for this release were done by Bill Holman. Holman had arranged his prior Capitol release. Gloria Wood and the Jud Conlon singers provide background vocals on several tracks.

Pianist Jimmy Rowles returns for his second appearance with Murphy. He was an in-demand accompanist for singers such as Billie Holiday, Ella Fitzgerald, Jo Stafford, Anita O'Day, and Julie London. Rowles along with bassist Joe Mondragon and either drummer Mel Lewis or Stan Levy formed the rhythm section. The trumpeters Conte Candoli and his brother Pete Candoli returned as well.

Many of the chosen tunes were hits for other singers. "Come to Me" was a hit for Johnny Mathis in 1958 and "It's Not For Me to Say" for Mathis in 1957, "Venus" for Frankie Avalon in 1959, "Firefly" for Tony Bennett in 1958, "Personality" for Lloyd Price in 1959, "Send for Me" for Nat Cole in 1957, and "Witchcraft" for Frank Sinatra in 1957. Years later Murphy told James Gavin that he and Holman, "did songs from the hit parade and tried to make them hip". "I Only Have Eyes for You" contains Murphy's first recorded scat solo".

== Reception ==
Professional ratings
Review scores
Source	Rating
The Virgin Encyclopedia of Popular Music	3/5 stars
DownBeat	3/5 stars

Colin Larkin assigns the record 3 stars in The Virgin Encyclopedia of Popular Music. Three stars means, "Good. By the artist's usual standards and therefore recommended". He wrote, "the appearance of several albums in the late 50s announced that the jazz world had a new and important singer in its midst".

Ralph J Gleason assigns 3 stars in DownBeat magazine. He wrote, "Murphy is a pleasant, Sinatra-ish singer with a broad tone, a self-conscious manner, and a tendency to be overly mannered". He praised the band, writing, "Bill Holman has produced a crack musical accompaniment. The individual arrangements and the overall performance of the band is crisp. refreshing, and tasteful". He called the album, "a curious collection of tunes, mainly the better hits of recent years. and it's a commentary of sorts that only because of its rock 'n roll reprise would "I Only Have Eyes for You" be included".

Murphy biographer Peter Jones said, "There are plenty of wince-inducing moments. The worst problem is over-production".

Will Friedwald said that the albums made during this period from 1956 to 1960 "reveal a young singer with a strong, dark, attractive voice, with a lot of good ideas and an obvious commitment to the jazz idiom-but one who stops just short of having a sound and a style of his own".

The attempt to capitalize on the previous success of the songs didn't work for Murphy and the album did poorly. Murphy said, "I had tried to compromise, which of course was a mistake. People who wanted those songs didn't want to hear me, and people who liked me didn't want to hear those songs. They printed too many copies and it sank. We were kind of traumatized." "I'm an alternative singer. In those days we didn't know what to call it", Murphy told Gavin.

== Track listing ==
1. "Firefly" (Carolyn Leigh, Cy Coleman) – 2:28
2. "Lonesome Town" (Baker Knight) – 2:26
3. "Kansas City" (Mike Stoller, Jerry Leiber) – 2:42
4. "Come to Me" (Peter Lind Hayes, Robert Allen) – 2:18
5. "Catch a Falling Star" (Lee Pockriss, Paul Vance) – 2:46
6. "All the Way" (James Van Heusen, Sammy Cahn) – 2:51
7. "Personality" (Harold Logan, Lloyd Price ) – 2:42
8. "Witchcraft" (Leigh, Coleman) – 3:35
9. "Venus" (Ed Marshall) – 3:02
10. "It's Not for Me to Say" (Al Stillman, Robert Allen) – 2:31
11. "Send for Me" (Ollie Jones) – 3:00
12. "I Only Have Eyes for You" (Al Dubin, Harry Warren) – 3:02

== Personnel ==
Performance

- Mark Murphy – vocals
- Bill Holman – arranger, conductor, tenor saxophone (track 3), baritone saxophone (tracks 8, 11)
- Joe Mondragon – bass guitar
- Jimmy Rowles – piano (except 2)
- Stan Levey – drums (tracks 3, 6, 10, 11)
- Mel Lewis – drums (tracks 1, 4, 5, 7, 8, 9, 12)
- Larry Bunker – vibraphone, percussion (tracks 1, 4, 5, 7, 8, 9, 12)
- Bob Gibbons – guitar (except 2)
- Conte Candoli – trumpet (tracks 1, 3, 5 – 12), percussion track 4
- Pete Candoli – trumpet (tracks 1, 3, 5, 6, 8, 10, 11), percussion track 4
- Lee Katzman – trumpet (tracks 7, 9, 12)
- Gloria Wood – background vocals (tracks 1, 2, 5, 7, 9)
- Jud Conlon Singers – background vocals (tracks 1, 5, 7, 8, 9)

Production

- Unknown – engineer, recorded in Capitol Studios, Vine Street, Los Angeles August 24, 26, 28, 1959
- Tom Morgan – producer
- Peggy Lee – liner notes
