= Bop for Kerouac =

- Original album cover by Daniel R Kuhn, Cathleen W Chin, JP Kuhn

Studio album by Mark Murphy
- Released: 1981
- Recorded: March 12, 1981
- Studios: Sage and Sound Studios, Hollywood
- Genre: Vocal jazz
- Length: 39:16
- Label: Muse
- Producer: Bill Mays

Mark Murphy chronology
Satisfaction Guaranteed (1979)	Bop for Kerouac (1981)	The Artistry of Mark Murphy (1982)

Bop for Kerouac is a 1981 studio album by Mark Murphy.

Bop for Kerouac is the 18th recorded album by American jazz vocalist Mark Murphy. It was released by Muse in the United States in 1981. The release is a tribute to Beat writer Jack Kerouac and bebop. Murphy reads excerpts from two of Kerouac's works, The Subterraneans in "Parker's Mood" (track 3) and On the Road in "Ballad of the Sad Young Men" (track 8).

Mark Murphy recorded Bop for Kerouac in six hours on March 12, 1981, with producer and arranger Bill Mays and saxophonist Richie Cole. The album reflects Murphy's interest in the hip Beat Generation, Jack Kerouac, bebop, vocalese, mixing storytelling with music, ballads, and using the voice as a musical instrument for improvisation. Lyrical themes include isolation, loneliness, and bebop's masters. It includes quotes from Kerouac both on the album sleeve and in the tunes themselves. It was followed by a sequel, Kerouac Then and Now, released in 1989. Both albums were met with critical acclaim. Murphy was at his peak. As was typical with his Muse releases, he was paid a flat fee upfront and received no royalties.

== Background ==
In his book, This is Hip: The Life of Mark Murphy, author Peter Jones writes that "With Bop for Kerouac, Mark Murphy showed that it was possible to be nostalgic for something that was far from mom and apple pie. In his celebration of the most liberal writer America has ever produced, Murphy offered an alternative vision of both the Fifties and the present". Murphy had recorded bop and vocalese (words added to an instrumental soloist's improvisation) previously but this was a complete concept album dedicated to Jack Kerouac.

When asked about his favorite personal recordings years later in an interview with Ted Pankin for Jazziz, Murphy said, "We accomplished some rather remarkable things with Bop for Kerouac and the second Kerouac record. I was really responsible, I think, for bringing the Kerouac name back into the fore, because two years after my record came out, I noticed that the records started putting out Beat Generation stuff. Hmm! I was never given any credit for it, but anyway, that was my thought on it".

Dan Ouellette, writing in a feature in DownBeat in 1997 singles out for praise Murphy's "bold Kerouac projects" in which Murphy "unleashed a dazzling display of rambling, hip-daddy-o, stream-of-consciousness vocalese ... What started out as an experiment in capturing Kerouac’s spirit of wordplay turned into some of Murphy’s most organic, inspirational and spur-of-the- moment material". Ouellette quotes Murphy:

"Basically I was looking for another way to do a bebop album. I never met Jack, and I never expected I’d become a Kerouacian, but I am one of the lucky people still alive who did see Lord Buckley perform...What really turned me on about this guy was that he wrote like an improvising musician...I really connected to him".

Murphy told James Gavin, "Why should I do another be-bop album and leave out the man who re-created the bop era for us all"?

== Recording ==
Working on a tight budget and "allotted with just six hours to do the entire project", Bill Mays was hired to arrange, conduct and produce the recording by Joe Fields of Muse Records. Bill Mays said,

"I hate working that fast really. I mean, even to have just another six hours would take the pressure off ... But Mark was very well prepared. Before we went in, he and I rehearsed very thoroughly at my apartment, where I had a nice Steinway piano. Mark had me underscore the readings much like I might do in a film segment. We knocked out an awful lot of music in six hours."

He hired Richie Cole and Bruce Forman. Mays said, "The thing about that album that I'm proud of is that I had a small group, and I made it sound like a little big band, especially "Boplicity"." Murphy had definite ideas about how he wanted each tune to go. Murphy was essentially the co-arranger on many of the tunes. Mays characterized Murphy as loose, go-with-the-flow, never getting angry. The day of the recording a film crew blew out the power, delaying the start of the recording and Richie Cole's car was hit in the parking lot. Even so they finished on time within the tight six hour schedule.

The album sleeve features short notes from beat poets Lawrence Ferlinghetti and Gregory Corso, as well as Steve Allen, publisher Jay Landesman, Kerouac biographer Lawrence Lee, and San Francisco club-owner Fred Kuh. In addition, a quotation from a 1959 Playboy article by Kerouac, "The Origins of the Beat Generation" is included.

Author Peter Jones said that Murphy "appreciated the freedom he had with Muse to pursue his own creative projects". Murphy said, "I never could have done Kerouac anywhere else".

== Touring ==
Murphy tried out the entire album live at Le Café in Sherman Oaks. Murphy was happy with the reception. He said, "But each night the one they roared for and sometimes stood for was the 8 minute track combining the last page of Kerouac's On the Road and the Landesman/Wolfe song (written for Jack's Beat Generation) "The Ballad of the Sad Young Men".

Professional ratings
Review scores
Source	Rating
Virgin Encyclopedia of Popular Music	4/5 stars
AllMusic	4.5/5 stars
The Penguin Guide to Jazz	(3)/5 stars
Rolling Stone Jazz & Blues Album Guide	4/5 stars
DownBeat	5/5 stars

== Reception ==
Overall the critical reception to the album has been positive. Most reviewers find the album to be excellent, one of Murphy's essential recordings. The album helped establish Murphy as a bebop singer and forever associated him with the Beat lifestyle and to bebop music. Reviewer's find the Kerouac readings to be highly expressive and to blend perfectly with the associated tunes. Many of the recordings were popular in Murphy's live performances for the rest of his career.

The album was nominated for a 1982 Grammy award at the 25th annual Grammy awards for Best Jazz Vocal Performance, Male, but lost to Mel Tormé for An Evening with George Shearing & Mel Tormé.

In his book, A Biographical Guide to the Great Jazz and Pop Singers, author Will Friedwald says that the recording is "Murphy's most successful concept album" and calls it "extraordinary". Friedwald calls Murphy a cultural critic and says this recording along with the later Kerouac, Then and Now to be his "ultimate statement on literary and musical beatnikism...focusing on Kerouac as a pop culture hero, and dwelling on the music of Charlie Parker and his inner circle of bebop heroes, such as Charles Mingus and Sonny Rollins." Friedwald laments that the vocal versions of jazz instrumentals would have been better left wordless (tracks 2 and 5). He singles out the ballads and prose recitations as high points. He finds the final track "The Ballad of the Sad Young Men" with the Kerouac introduction to be "stunningly perfect".

The AllMusic entry written by Sott Yanow gives the album 4.5 stars saying, "this poetry and jazz set works surprisingly well". Yanow also includes the album in his list of best individual Muse sets by Mark Murphy in his book The Jazz Singers: The Ultimate Guide.

The Virgin Encyclopedia of Popular Music rates the release as excellent (4/5, meaning a high standard album from this artist and therefore highly recommended).

Andrew Gilbert, writing for MusicHound Jazz, calls the album a "highly effective jazz/literature project".

The Penguin Guide to Jazz assigns 3 stars (meaning a good if middleweight set; one that lacks the stature or consistency of the finest records, but which is certainly rewarding on its own terms).

John Swenson, in The Rolling Stone Jazz & Blues Album Guide, assigns the album 4 stars (excellent, representing peak performances in an artist's career, and providing the best introduction to an artist's work) and calls the recording "an engaging mixture of bop standards interspersed with Kerouac readings".

Stereo Review gives the album an Honorable Mention in its annual Record of the Year Awards for 1981, selected by editorial staff and critics. Chris Albertson writing a 1982 review of the album in Stereo Review calls it a contender for vocal album of the year and says he was "overwhelmed" by the results achieved by Murphy and Richie Cole and calls the blend of poetry and jazz "perfect".

Owen Cordle, writing in DownBeat magazine in 1982 likens Richie Cole playing Bird (Charlie Parker) to Mark Murphy's Miles Davis, capturing a "detached cool intensity" in the bebop music. He gives the album a 5 star rating. He says that "Boplicity" "slips in like the birth of the cool, deliberately laidback, smoldering underneath". Writing about the recordings of "The Bad And The Beautiful" and "Ballad Of The Sad Young Men" (with a reading from On The Road), Cordle says they "become a cathartic ache in the heart as Murphy stretches his phrases nearly to the tensile limit of emotion, most like early Miles".

Author, singer, musician, and composer Peter Jones notes that "Bop For Kerouac combines the sadness and the euphoria of the intertwined jazz and beatnik lifestyles that Murphy knew from the inside, but it isn't the crazed, ecstatic homage to bebop that one might expect...the overall tone is elegiac, and ballads dominate".

Writer James Gavin said, "It remains, I think, his greatest achievement on record, and an album that I play to this day. It has all of the best of Mark and none of the worst of Mark." James Gavin calls the album "one of the most moving vocal albums in jazz". He finds the tracks with Kerouac readings highly evocative of the 1950s jazz club scene with Murphy an ideal storyteller to take you there. He singles out the Lester Young portrait in Joni Mitchell's lyrics to the Mingus tune "Goodbye Pork Pie Hat" and likens Richie Cole as the Young to Murphy's Billie Holiday. Commenting on the ballads, Gavin finds those recordings capture the loneliness of the Beat lifestyle and likens Murphy's Kerouac readings to Montgomery Clift in vocal expressivity. In an article for the Village Voice Gavin calls Bop for Kerouac a masterpiece with a "gripping portrait of the '50's underworld".

== Track listing ==
1. "Be-Bop Lives (Boplicity)" (Miles Davis, Ray Passman, Holli Ross) – 6:39
2. "Goodbye Pork Pie Hat" (Charles Mingus, Joni Mitchell) – 4:53
3. "Parker's Mood" (Charlie Parker, King Pleasure) – 4:33
  - Includes a reading from The Subterraneans by Jack Kerouac
4. "You Better Go Now" (Irvin Graham, Bickley Reichner) – 3:26
5. "You've Proven Your Point (Bongo Beep)" (Charlie Parker) – 3:47
6. "The Bad and the Beautiful" (David Raksin, Dory Previn) – 3:54
7. "Down St. Thomas Way" (Sonny Rollins, Ray Passman, Herb Wasserman) – 5:06
8. "Ballad of the Sad Young Men" (Tommy Wolf, Fran Landesman) – 7:37
  - Includes a reading from On the Road by Jack Kerouac

== Personnel ==
Performance

- Mark Murphy – vocals
- Bob Magnusson – bass
- Luther Hughes – bass
- Jeff Hamilton – drums
- Roy McCurdy – drums
- Bill Mays – keyboards, arranger, conductor
- Richie Cole – alto saxophone, tenor saxophone
- Bruce Forman – guitar
- Michael Spiro – percussion

Production

- Jim Mooney – engineer
- Bill Mays – producer
- J.P. ‘‘Really Happy’’ Kuhn – cover
- Cathleen W. Chin – photography
- Mark Murphy – liner notes
