= Anita Ellis =

American actress and singer (1920–2015)

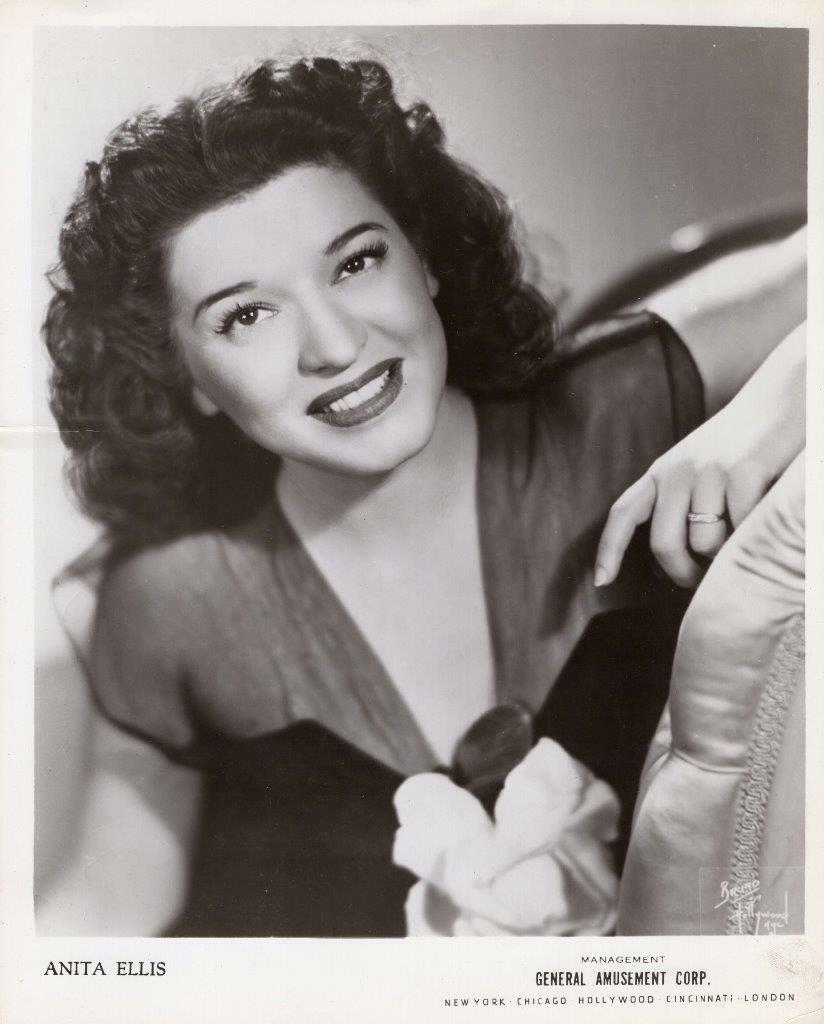
- Ellis in c. 1945
- Born: Anita Kert; April 12, 1920; Montreal, Quebec, Canada
- Died: October 28, 2015 (aged 95); Unknown
- Education: College of Music, Cincinnati, Ohio
- Occupations: Singer, actress
- Known for: Dubbing singing voices for famous actresses
- Spouses: Frank Ellis (m. 1943; div. 1946); Mortimer Fromberg Shapiro (m. 1960; died 1994)
- Relatives: Larry Kert (brother)

Anita Ellis (née Kert, later Shapiro; April 12, 1920 – October 28, 2015) was a Canadian-born American singer and actress. She famously dubbed Rita Hayworth's songs in Gilda.

== Early years ==
Anita Kert was born in Montreal, Quebec, the eldest of four children born to Orthodox Jewish parents, Harry and Lillian "Libbie" Kert (née Pearson; originally Peretz). She had a younger sister and two younger brothers, one of whom, Larry Kert (1930–1991), became an actor and singer best known for originating the role of Tony in the Broadway musical West Side Story. The family moved to Hollywood when she was nine years old. She graduated from Hollywood High School in 1938 and attended the College of Music in Cincinnati, Ohio.

Ellis became a naturalized United States citizen in 1950.

== Voice dubbing ==
Ellis dubbed the singing voices of such actresses as Rita Hayworth (notably in Gilda, 1946), Vera-Ellen, and Jeanne Crain. Twenty-eight years after Gilda was released, entertainment writer Rex Reed reminisced in print about Ellis's voice: "I fell in love with Anita Ellis when I was 8 years old ... Only I didn't know she was Anita Ellis, I thought she was Rita Hayworth ... That was the sexiest voice in 1946, and it kept turning people on for years ..."

Ellis's involvement in Gilda as a ghost singer was greatly underplayed and kept secret by the producers, who wanted fans to believe Hayworth was the singer. They went as far as putting Rita Hayworth in the soundtrack credits instead of Anita Ellis. Hayworth also bore some resentment toward the studio for not allowing her to perform her own songs and for the embarrassment caused when she was asked to sing by fans who thought she was the voice of Gilda. There were claims made that Hayworth had sung the acoustic guitar version of "Put the Blame on Mame." This was untrue; Ellis dubbed Hayworth in all of the film's singing scenes.

== Radio ==
In 1941 she joined WLW in Cincinnati, Ohio, as a singer. Billed as Anita Kurt, she was a regular on Open House (also known as The Ona Munson Show), The New Jack Carson Show, and Tommy Riggs and Betty Lou.

Billed as Anita Ellis, she was also a regular on The Charlie McCarthy Show and The Jack Carson Show. She was a regular guest on The Red Skelton Show. (Two sources list Ellis as one of the vocalists on Skelton's show, without the "guest" modifier.)

== Discography ==
- I Wonder What Became Of Me (Epic, 1956)
- Hims (Epic, 1957)
- The World In My Arms (Elektra, 1960)
- A Legend Sings (Orion, 1979)
- Echoes (Michael's Pub, 1979)

=== Compilations ===
Releases of material from earlier years.

- Anita Ellis With Mitchell Ayres And His Orchestra - Eugenie Baird With D'Artego And The Cavalcade Orchestra
- Look to the Rainbow

== Personal life ==
Ellis married U.S. Army Lt. Frank Wilby Ellis Jr. (1916–1957) on January 23, 1943, in Tucson, Arizona. They divorced in 1946. Lt. Ellis was killed in the crash of TB-47B "Stratojet" #50-0076 on December 18, 1957, while serving as pilot. She remarried, to neurologist Dr. Mortimer Fromberg Shapiro, an Icahn School of Medicine at Mount Sinai faculty member, on July 31, 1960; the couple remained together until Shapiro's death on June 6, 1995. Both unions were childless.

She "traveled through the wilderness of Africa and the Himalayas, and taught nature studies at the American Museum of Natural History." In the 1950s Ellis stopped performing while she underwent psychoanalysis. She returned to professional singing with performances in nightclubs and a recording contract with Epic Records. In 1957 columnist Dorothy Kilgallen wrote: "Anita Ellis ... has surprised everyone with her new jazz singer style. She gives her analyst credit for the New Sound."

Ellis had a pilot's license and flew her own plane for pleasure.

== Later years and death ==
A newspaper article in 1979 reported that Ellis had suffered from stage fright for more than 25 years. Ellis described her condition as "not just stage fright. It's more than that. It's really crippling. It's kept me from my own gifts. It just stops me cold. I don't sing."

She eventually ended her career in 1987 due to her stage fright. A widow, she lived in Manhattan and had suffered from Alzheimer's disease since 2000; she died on October 28, 2015, aged 95, from the disease. Mt. Sinai Hospital's department of neurology received a $1 million gift to support strategic priorities from her estate.

== Filmography ==
Ellis worked on the following films:

- Dancing Co-Ed (1939)
- Babes in Arms (1939)
- Forty Little Mothers (1940)
- Strike Up the Band (1940)
- Gilda (1946)
- The Lady from Shanghai (1947)
- Dakota Lil (1950)
- The Joe Louis Story (1953)
- Gentlemen Marry Brunettes (1955)
- Pull My Daisy (1959)
- Nothing Lasts Forever (1984)
