= Ted Panken =

American jazz journalist

- Born: Theodore Panken
- Occupations: Music writer, radio DJ
- Notable credit: Columbia University's WKCR-FM (1985–2008)
- Writing career
- Notable awards: Jazz Journalists Association's Lifetime Achievement in Jazz Journalism Award, 2016

Ted Panken is an American jazz journalist based in New York City. He has written for publications including DownBeat, Jazziz, and Jazz Times, the New York Daily News and jazz.com. From 1985 to 2008, he was a jazz radio DJ at Columbia University's WKCR station. He has written more than 500 liner notes.

Panken is a member of the nominating committee for the Jazz Journalists Association's Critics' Choice Awards.

== Awards ==
- Lifetime Achievement in Jazz Journalism Award, Jazz Journalists Association, 2016.
- Robert Palmer-Helen Oakley Dance Award for Excellence in Writing, Jazz Journalists Association, 2021
- Book of the Year, Jazz Journalists Association -- For: Life in E Flat: The Autobiography of Phil Woods, 2021

== Publications ==
- Phil Woods with Ted Panken. (2021). Life in E Flat: The Autobiography of Phil Woods, Cymbal Press
