= Michael S. Smith (drummer) =

American drummer (1946–2006)

Michael Smith

Background information
- Birth name: Michael Scott Smith
- Also known as: Mike Smith
- Born: January 30, 1946
- Died: January 2, 2006 (aged 59)
- Genres: Jazz, Avant-garde music, Ambient music, Soul music
- Occupation: Musician
- Instrument(s): drums, percussion
- Years active: 1965–2005

Michael Scott Smith (January 30, 1946 – January 2, 2006) was an American jazz drummer and percussionist. Based in the Washington D.C. - Baltimore area for most of his 40-year career, Smith played with many jazz greats including Dave Liebman, Herbie Hancock, John Abercrombie, Randy Brecker, Tommy Flanagan, Billy Eckstein, Astrud Gilberto, Freddie Hubbard, Herb Ellis, and Milt Jackson.

== Early life ==
He grew up in Meadville, Pennsylvania, where his father exposed him to jazz at an early age. At age 8, Smith began taking drum lessons from local jazz drummer, Cootie Harris. His father and Harris took young Smith to local jam sessions throughout Northwestern PA. His early influences included drummers Art Blakey and Philly Joe Jones.

As a student at Youngstown State University, Smith played gigs in and around Youngstown and Pittsburgh, most notably with pianists Gene Rush and Harold Danko, and cellist Abdul Wadud.

== Career ==
Smith transferred to Howard University in Washington D.C. where he began his playing career. He was tapped to play with jazz pianist Bobby Timmons at the famed Bohemian Caverns jazz club.

He soon got the attention of other well-known jazz musicians, including vibraphonist Gary Burton. Burton asked him to join his ensemble on tour, but Smith declined due to fear of being drafted and sent to Vietnam. Smith eventually dropped out of Howard, was drafted, then classified as 4-F due to a history of migraine headaches.

He joined his friend, bassist Terry Plumeri, in the group, Love, Cry, Want, a free-improvisation group with jazz, blues, and rock influences. Smith eventually recorded with Plumeri on two albums, He Who Lives In Many Places (1971) featuring Herbie Hancock and John Abercrombie, and Water Garden (1978) (formerly titled Ongoing) with Abercrombie, Ralph Towner, and the National Symphony String Quartet.

Smith helped form the ambient music group, The Entourage Music and Theater Ensemble with Joe Clark, Rusti Clark, and Wall Matthews. This group made two recordings for Folkways Records and performed in theaters in combination with dance ensembles. In 2003, the electronic music artist Four Tet sampled, without permission, the Entourage composition, Neptune Rising, and used it as the basis for the hit single, "She Moves She."

He toured nationally with Roberta Flack from 1971 to 1972. He left Flack's band and returned to his home base in Washington D.C. where he performed and recorded with local jazz musicians. The Washington Post included Smith in its 1974 Who's Who of D.C. artists and musicians.

In 1976, Smith traveled to Germany to record with pianist Steve Kuhn, bassist Harvie Swartz, and saxophonist Steve Slagle. The resulting recording was the critically successful LP, Steve Kuhn & Ecstasy - Motility on the ECM Records label. In 1984, he recorded with pianist/bassist Don Thompson on his Juno Award-winning LP, A Beautiful Friendship. He toured Europe and appeared with pianist Adam Makowicz at the North Sea Jazz Festival in 1986 and 1987 playing to large appreciative crowds.

During the 1980s, Smith was the go-to drummer for saxophonist Dave Liebman and singer/songwriter Mose Allison whenever they came to Washington. Smith continued to play jazz clubs and record with local jazz musicians, most notably Paul Bollenback and a trio with David Kane (pianist) and bassist Drew Gress.

== Death ==
He was diagnosed with prostate cancer in late 2003. His last recording was with David Kane, Drew Gress, and Dave Liebman on Kane's CD, Grey Matters (2005). Although suffering from walking pneumonia and severe bone pain, his performance during this session was not noticeably affected. The effects of prostate cancer eventually sidelined Smith in November 2005 and he died on January 2, 2006. A tribute to Smith was held at the renowned jazz club, Blues Alley on January 10, 2006, an event that was attended by many of the top jazz musicians in the DC area.

== Selected discography ==
- Terry Plumeri - He Who Lives in Many Places (1971); reissued 2007
- The Entourage Music and Theater Ensemble (1973)
- The Neptune Collection (1975)
- Steve Kuhn & Ecstasy - Motility (1977); re-issued in Kuhn's limited edition ECM boxset, Life's Backward Glances (2009)
- Terry Plumeri - Ongoing (1978); re-issued 2007 as Water Garden
- Don Thompson Quartet - A Beautiful Friendship (1984) - Juno Award Winner, Best Jazz Album (1985)
- David Kane - March Heir (1988)
- Tekke - Tekke (1989)
- John Wubbenhorst - Facing East (1997)
- Rob Levit - Silence (1999)
- David Kane - Grey Matters (2005)
