= Sum of the Parts =

Studio album by Ed Summerlin
- Released: 1998
- Genres: Avant-garde jazz, Free jazz
- Label: Ictus

Ed Summerlin chronology
Still At It (1994)	Sum of the Parts (1998)	Eye on the Future (1999)

Professional ratings
Review scores
Source	Rating
Los Angeles Times	3/4 stars

Sum of the Parts is an album by tenor saxophonist/composer-arranger Ed Summerlin, released in 1998 on the Ictus label.

== Reception ==
Los Angeles Times reviewer, and Summerlin's onetime bandmate, Don Heckman, (Note: Starting in 1964, the two had co-led the Improvisational Jazz Workshop, a group which performed frequently and produced one eponymous album in 1967. Heckman also played on Summerlin's subsequent album, Ring Out Joy, released in 1969.) gave the album 3 stars and paid tribute to his erstwhile collaborator.

Veteran tenor saxophonist-composer Ed Summerlin has been effectively venturing through the jazz avant-garde for more than three decades. "Sum of the Parts" displays the complexities and inherent swing in his dissonant, contrapuntal music. Resonant with influences from George Russell and Ornette Coleman, it nonetheless comes together as one of the genuinely individual voices in the arena of exploratory jazz.

== Personnel ==
- Bruce Ahrens – trumpet
- Ron Finck – alto saxophone
- Ed Summerlin – tenor saxophone
- Tony Marino – bass
- Joe Chambers – drums

All personnel information accessed via JazzLoft.com.
