= Last Year's Waltz =

Live album by the Steve Kuhn Quartet
- Released: March 1982
- Recorded: April 1981
- Venue: Fat Tuesday's; New York City
- Genre: Jazz
- Length: 50:20
- Label: ECM; ECM 1213
- Producer: Robert Hurwitz

Steve Kuhn chronology
Playground (1980)	Last Year's Waltz (1982)	Mostly Ballads (1986)

Last Year's Waltz is a live album by the Steve Kuhn Quartet recorded at Fat Tuesday's in April 1981 and released on ECM March the following year. The quartet features singer Sheila Jordan and rhythm section Harvie Swartz and Bob Moses.

== Reception ==
The AllMusic review by Scott Yanow stated, "Although Jordan functions as a member of the band, her highly appealing singing is the main reason to acquire this memorable and well-rounded disc."

Professional ratings
Review scores
Source	Rating
AllMusic	3/5 stars
The Rolling Stone Jazz Record Guide	4/5 stars

== Track listing ==
All tracks are written by Steve Kuhn, except as noted.

Side I
No.	Title	Writer(s)	Length
1.	"Turn to Gold"		4:01
2.	"The Drinking Song"		5:55
3.	"Last Year's Waltz"		4:18
4.	"I Remember You"	Schertzinger, Mercer	8:40

Side II
No.	Title	Writer(s)	Length
1.	"Mexico"	Harvie Swartz	5:18
2.	"The Fruit Fly"		5:52
3.	"The Feeling Within"		4:48
4.	"Medley: Old Folks/Well, You Needn't"	Dedette Lee Hill, Robison, Monk	2:05
5.	"Confirmation"	Parker	5:35
6.	"The City of Dallas"	Steve Swallow	3:48

== Personnel ==
=== Steve Kuhn Quartet ===
- Steve Kuhn – piano
- Sheila Jordan – voice
- Harvie Swartz – bass
- Bob Moses – drums
