= Ring Out Joy =

Studio album by Ed Summerlin
- Released: 1968
- Recorded: April 1968
- Genre: Avant-garde, free jazz, Christian
- Length: 40:00
- Label: Avant-Garde

Ed Summerlin chronology
The Don Heckman-Ed Summerlin Improvisational Jazz Workshop (1967)	Ring Out Joy (1968)	Still At It (1994)

Ring Out Joy is the third album by tenor saxophonist Ed Summerlin, recorded in April 1968 and released later that year on the Avant-Garde label. The album marks a return to the religious concerns that characterized Summerlin's 1960 debut LP, Liturgical Jazz.

== Track listing ==
All music is composed by Ed Summerlin.

Side one
No.	Title	Length
1.	"Gift of Joy"	4:06
2.	"The Coming of Christ, Part I Prelude: The New Men"	4:15
3.	"Part II The New Humanity"	5:30
4.	"Part III Parousia"	6:25

Side two: Liturgy of the Holy Spirit
No.	Title	Length
5.	"Agape"	2:50
6.	"Hymn"	2:10
7.	"Mysterium"	5:24
8.	"Offertory Anthem"	4:50
9.	"Hymn of the Commitment"	1:40
10.	"Epiklesis"	2:16
11.	"Recessional Hymn"	2:13

== Personnel ==
- Ed Summerlin – tenor saxophone, conductor
- Don Heckman – alto saxophone
- George Marge – tenor saxophone
- Marvin Stamm – trumpet
- Bob Norden – trombone
- Tony Studd – trombone
- Ron Carter – double bass
- Richard Davis – double bass
- Ed Shaughnessy – drums
- Rosemary Unutmaz – vocals on "Gift of Joy"
- William Robert Miller – text
- Choir recorded in London, April 14–20, 1968
