= The Saga of Harrison Crabfeathers =

Jazz standard by Steve Kuhn

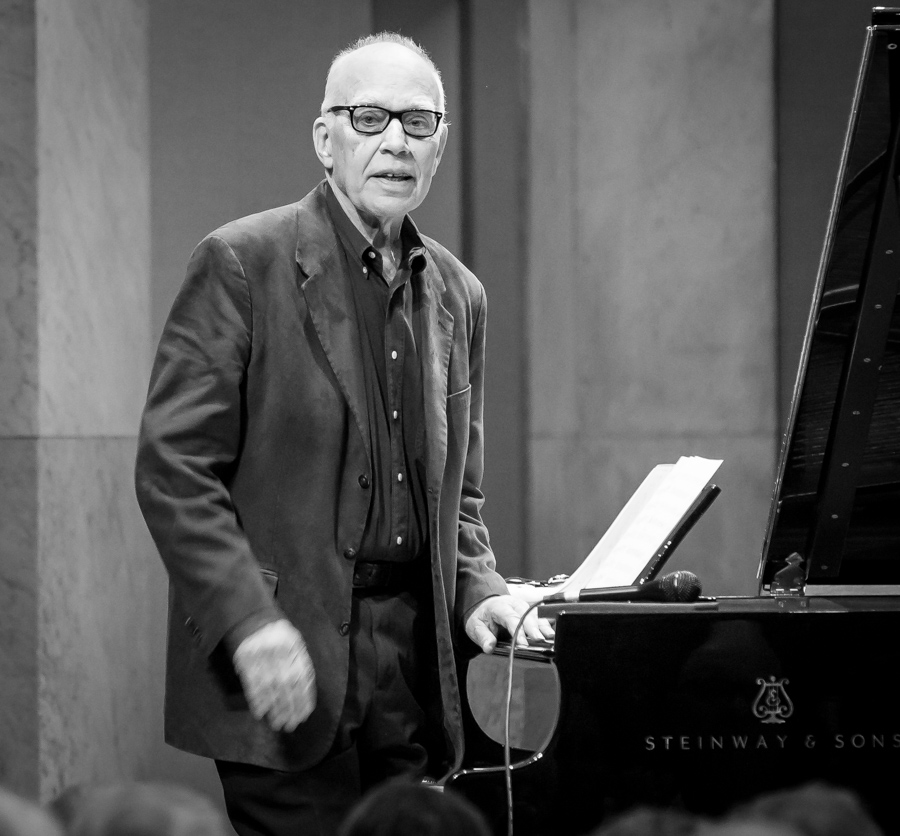
Steve Kuhn in 2017

The Saga of Harrison Crabfeathers is a jazz standard written by jazz pianist Steve Kuhn. An example of modal jazz, it was first recorded and released by Monica Zetterlund in October 1972. The song was also featured in Steve Kuhn Live in New York.

== Background ==
In an interview with Sheila Jordan in a book entitled Jazzwomen: Conversations with Twenty-One Musicians, Jordan noted: "Some people used to think [the song] was about a child who dies at an early age. Actually, it was originally named after a piano player who was advertised in the back of a Down Beat magazine. Steve saw the name and liked it. He never knew the guy, but he was intrigued with his name.”

== Composition ==
The piece is a waltz with three distinct tonal centers. The piece begins with 16 bars in the key of E minor, and it modulates to D minor for the second 16 bars. Following this, there is an 8-bar bridge in Abmaj7#11. The song ends with 16 bars in the key of C minor.

== Notable recordings ==
- Monica Zetterlund (1972)
- Sheila Jordan and Arild Andersen (1977)
- Viktoria Tolstoy (2001)
- David Andersen Trio (2002)
- Brian Bromberg (2002)
