= Steve Slagle =

American jazz saxophonist

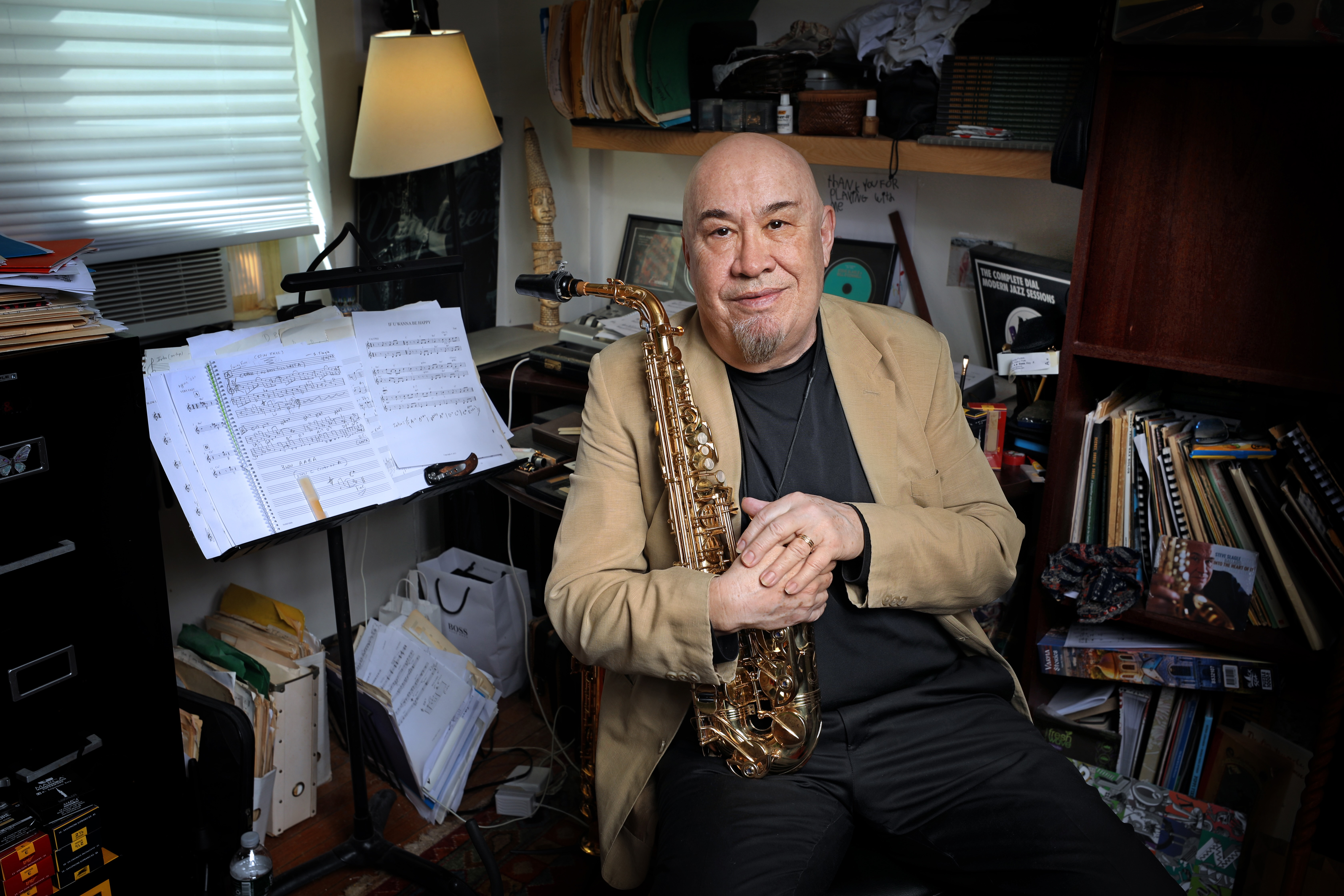

Background information
- Born: September 18, 1951 (age 74); Los Angeles, California
- Genres: Jazz
- Occupation: Musician
- Instruments: Saxophone; flute
- Years active: 1980s–present
- Labels: SteepleChase, Panorama, Atlantic
- Website: steveslaglemusic.com

Steve Slagle (born September 18, 1951) is an American jazz saxophonist.

== Biography ==
Slagle was born in Los Angeles and grew up in suburban Philadelphia. He received a scholarship to the Berklee College of Music and received a master's degree in Music From Manhattan School of Music. He came to New York in 1976, first working with Machito and his Afro-Cuban orchestra, and then recorded with Ray Barretto, Steve Kuhn, Lionel Hampton, Brother Jack McDuff, and Carla Bley. He also performed with Woody Herman and Cab Calloway. In the mid-1980s, he began leading his own combos, first with Mike Stern and Jaco Pastorius, and then with Dave Stryker. During the 1990s, he was featured in the Charles Mingus Big Band and did twelve arrangements for the Mingus band which were nominated for and received Grammy Awards. He also played frequently with Joe Lovano and featured on several of Lovano's albums, including the Grammy-winning 52nd Street Themes.

In the mid-1980s, global and especially Latin influences inflected Slagle's work. He appeared on albums by Milton Nascimento and recorded Rio Highlife in Brazil. He toured frequently during the 1990s and 2000s, especially in Europe, Japan, and South America. New New York, his 2000 release, has been seen as an expression of Slagle's love for the city he has made his home. He has played with such diverse artists as Milton Nascimento, St. Vincent, Elvis Costello, the Beastie Boys, and Mac Rebennack (aka Dr. John). Slagle has taught at the Manhattan School of Music, Rutgers, The New School, NYU, and clinics through the Thelonious Monk Institute as well as the Mingus Jazz Workshop and master classes and clinics worldwide.

Slagle recorded his composition “Hopewells Last” in 2007, and subsequently arranged it for the VJO Big Band in Sweden.

In 2015, Slagle's duo recording with pianist Bill O'Connell, a tribute album to Kenny Drew Jr., was released as The Power of Two. In February 2016, Routes (by the Stryker/Slagle Band-Expanded) was released. It was produced by Rick Simpson, with 4-horn arrangements by Slagle. Routes reached #2 on the national radio charts.

Since 2016, all of Slagle's records have been produced by Rick Simpson; Alto Manhattan (2017), Dedication (2018), Spirit Calls (2019), Alive In Harlem (2020), Nascentia, (2021) and Into The Heart Of It. (2022). Those recordings have appeared on USA//Canada jazz radio charts, at times charting at number one for multiple weeks. Slagle plays and endorses Yanagisawa saxophones — the WO-10 alto saxophone and S9930 soprano saxophone. He has also played Haynes flutes. On tenor sax, he plays a Selmer Mark VI, and, on baritone sax, a 1947 Silver Conn.

In 2011, Slagle published a composition and improvisation workbook for the creative musician, including stories about his life, in "Scenes, Songs and Solos" (Schaffner Press).

His compositions are published with Slagle Music, BMI.

== Discography ==
=== As leader/co-leader ===
- High Standards(Polydor, 1984)
- Rio Highlife (Atlantic, 1986)
- Smoke Signals (Panorama, 1991)
- The Steve Slagle Quartet (SteepleChase, 1993)
- Our Sound! (Double-Time, 1995)
- Reincarnation (SteepleChase, 1995)
- Spread the Word (SteepleChase, 1995)
- Alto Blue (SteepleChase, 1997)
- Steve Slagle Plays Monk (SteepleChase, 1998)
- New New York (OmniTone, 2000)
- Evensong (Panorama, 2013)
- The Power of Two with Bill O'Connell (Panorama, 2015)
- Alto Manhattan (Panorama, 2017)
- Dedication (Panorama, 2018)
- Spirit Calls (Panorama, 2019)
- Alive in Harlem (Panorama, 2020)
- Nascentia (Panorama, 2021)
- Into the Heart of It (Panorama, 2022)

The Stryker/Slagle Band
With Dave Stryker

- The Stryker/Slagle Band (Khaeon, 2003)
- Live at the Jazz Standard (Zoho, 2005)
- Latest Outlook (Zoho, 2007)
- The Scene (Zoho, 2008)
- Keeper (Panorama, 2010)
- Routes (Strikezone, 2016)

=== As sideman ===
With Carla Bley

- Live! (WATT/ECM, 1982)
- Mortelle Randonnee (Mercury, 1983)
- Heavy Heart (WATT/ECM, 1984)
- I Hate to Sing (WATT/ECM, 1984)
- Live in Montreal (L'Equipe Spectra, 2002)

With Lionel Hampton

- Hamp in Haarlem (Timeless, 1979)
- Live in Europe (Elite Special, 1980)
- Ambassador at Large (Glad-Hamp, 1984)

With Steve Kuhn

- Motility (ECM, 1977)
- Non-Fiction (ECM, 1978)

With Joe Lovano

- 52nd Street Themes (Blue Note, 2000)
- On This Day ... Live at The Vanguard (Blue Note, 2003)
- Streams of Expression (Blue Note, 2006)

With Mingus Big Band

- Mingus Big Band 93 Nostalgia in Times Square (Dreyfus, 1993)
- Gunslinging Birds (Dreyfus, 1995)
- Live in Time (Dreyfus, 1996)
- Que Viva Mingus! (Dreyfus, 1997)

With Bill O'Connell

- Rhapsody in Blue (Challenge, 2010)
- Zocalo (Savant, 2013)
- Imagine (Savant, 2014)
- Heart Beat (Savant, 2016)

With Dave Stryker

- First Strike (Someday of Mugen Music, 1990)
- Strike Zone (SteepleChase, 1991)
- Passage (SteepleChase, 1993)
- Full Moon (SteepleChase, 1994)
- Nomad (SteepleChase, 1995)
- Shades of Miles (SteepleChase, 2000)
- Changing Times (SteepleChase, 2001)
- Blue to the Bone III (SteepleChase, 2002)
- Shades Beyond (SteepleChase, 2004)
- Blue to the Bone IV (SteepleChase, 2013)
- Messin' with Mister T (Strikezone, 2015)

With others

- Ray Barretto, Handprints (Concord Picante, 1991)
- Barbara Dennerlein, Outhipped (Universal/Verve, 1999)
- Marianne Faithfull, Strange Weather (Island, 1987)
- Charlie Haden & Carla Bley, The Ballad of the Fallen (ECM, 1983)
- Craig Handy, Reflections in Change (Sirocco Music, 1999)
- High Life, High Life (Elektra Musician, 1986)
- Joe Jackson, Will Power (A&M, 1987)
- Mark Soskin, Keys of the City (Koei, 1990)
- Beastie Boys, Hello Nasty (Capitol, 1998)
