= From Memphis to Mobile =

2009 album by Jeff Rupert

Studio album by Jeff Rupert
- Released: 2009
- Genre: Jazz
- Length: 59:54
- Label: Random Act
- Producer: Jeff Rupert

Jeff Rupert chronology
Save Your Love for Me (2004)	From Memphis to Mobile (2009)	Jazz Town (2012)

From Memphis to Mobile is one of a pair of albums by freelance tenor saxophonist, songwriter, producer, and University of Central Florida jazz professor Jeff Rupert, featuring Kenny Drew Jr. on the piano.

== Track listing ==
All songs written and arranged by Jeff Rupert except where noted.

No.	Title	Length
1.	"Rock Skippin'"	5:07
2.	"Bad Moon"	7:24
3.	"If I Had Only Known"	5:02
4.	"Beatrice"	7:29
5.	"The Norfolk Southern RR"	4:21
6.	"I Loves You, Porgy" (George Gershwin)	7:19
7.	"Chasin' Tail"	3:22
8.	"Walking Home"	4:43
9.	"Basin Street Blues" (Spencer Williams)	5:40
10.	"Thunderbird"	5:27
11.	"A Single Petal of a Rose" (Edward Kennedy Ellington)	4:00

== Personnel ==
- Jeff Rupert - Tenor saxophone; primary composer; producer
- Kenny Drew Jr. - Piano
- Lyman Brodie - Flugelhorn
- Richard Drexler - Bass
- John K. Jenkins Sr. - Drums
