= Do That Again =

Do That Again may refer to:

- Do That Again (The Jazz Professors album), 2013
- Do That Again (Malcolm Todd album) or the title song, 2026
