= Ed Summerlin =

American jazz musician

- Born: Edgar Eugene Summerlin; September 1, 1928; Marianna, Florida, U.S.
- Died: October 10, 2006 (aged 78) Rhinebeck, New York
- Genres: Liturgical, avant-garde, free jazz
- Occupations: Musician, composer, arranger
- Instrument: Tenor saxophone
- Years active: 1955–present
- Labels: Ecclesia, Avant-Garde, Jazz Workshop, ICTUS

Edgar Eugene Summerlin (September 1, 1928 – October 10, 2006) was an American jazz saxophonist, composer, and educator known for pioneering Liturgical jazz, avant-garde jazz, and free jazz.

== Early life and career ==
Born on September 1, 1928 in Marianna, Florida, and raised primarily in Missouri (in the towns of Gasconade, Brunswick, and Lexington, respectively), Summerlin was the second of four children born to Velma and William Edgar Summerlin. In 1940, he began attending Lexington Junior-Senior High School, and was promptly elected president of the 7th grade. Summerlin graduated from Central Missouri State University in 1951 with a Bachelor of Music Education (alongside his then wife, Virginia, receiving her bachelor of science); the following year, he earned a Master of Music from the Eastman School. He subsequently free-lanced for approximately half a decade, including stints with bandleaders Sonny Dunham, Ted Weems, and Tony Pastor. In 1958, after learning about the University of North Texas College of Music while performing with the Johnny Long Band, Summerlin enrolled as a graduate student and became a member of Lab Band and also assisted Gene Hall in teaching jazz composition, theory, and saxophone.

=== Liturgical works ===
On January 27, 1959, while a graduate student at the University of North Texas College of Music, Summerlin, along with his then wife, Mary Elizabeth, suffered the horribly untimely, but evidently not unforeseen passing of their less-than-10-month-old daughter, attributed by attending physician Thomas V. Patterson to "congestive heart failure due to congenital heart disease." Shortly thereafter, acting on the suggestion of Bill Slack, Jr., Assistant Pastor of the First Methodist Church of Denton (who had been a great comfort to the Summerlins in the weeks leading up to their daughter's death), Summerlin composed Requiem for Mary Jo, which has long been regarded as one of the first significant uses of jazz in a liturgical service.

He performed Requiem for Mary Jo May 20, 1959, during a service in the chapel at the Perkins School of Theology, Southern Methodist University. Dr. Roger Ellwood Ortmayer (1916–1984), then of the Perkins School, had commissioned the work.

That same year, still studying and teaching at North Texas, Summerlin recorded his debut LP, Liturgical Jazz, on which "Requiem for Mary Jo," was the heartbreaking centerpiece.

Saturday night, February 13, 1960, NBC's World Wide 60 (hosted by Chet Huntley) visited Denton to air the story of Ed Summerlin's liturgical jazz (national broadcast, NBC, Friday, February 19, 1960).

Summerlin's grieving and spiritual creativity inspired him to compose other liturgical jazz pieces, including

- Episcopal Evensong
- Jazz Vespers Service
- Liturgy of the Holy Spirit

=== TV and film work ===
At the same time, his well-publicized prime time television debut was followed by several Sunday morning appearances throughout the 1960s on the long-running CBS series, Look Up and Live, collaborating with musicians such as Freddie Hubbard, Eric Dolphy, Don Ellis, Slide Hampton, and Ron Carter, as well as choreographer Anna Sokolow. During this decade, Summerlin also scored two feature films, the little-known 1963 Bay of Pigs-inspired drama, We Shall Return (which, coincidentally, featured the first and only original screenplay by oft-adapted novelist Pat Frank) and the even lesser known 1967 film Ciao (written and directed by the earlier film's editor, David Tucker), which, after becoming the only U.S. feature film to be entered in that year's Venice Film Festival, failed to find a distributor and quickly disappeared from view.

=== New York ===
Summerlin relocated to New York in the early 1960s, where he gradually established himself as an avant-garde tenor saxophonist, composer and arranger, freelancing with Eric Dolphy, Pete LaRoca, Don Ellis, and Sheila Jordan. He also composed and arranged for Ron Carter, Kuhn, Freddie Hubbard, Dave Liebman, Toshiko Akiyoshi, and Lee Konitz. In 1966, he worked with Jackson Mac Low, Max Neuhaus, James Tenney, David Behrman, Philip Corner, Jeanne Lee, Emmett Williams, David Antin, and others. In 1969, collaborated with saxophonist and journalist Don Heckman to co-lead the Improvisational Jazz Workshop.

In 1971, Summerlin founded the jazz program at City College of New York, which he was director until 1989.

== Personal life and death ==
Summerlin was married three times. On August 29, 1948, three days before his 20th birthday, Summerlin and his Central Missouri State classmate Virginia Lee Allen were married at the First Presbyterian Church in Independence; their son, Sean Eugene, was born the following year on October 29. In September 1954, Mrs. Summerlin filed for divorce; it was granted in 1955. In September 1955, Summerlin married Mary Elizabeth Bouknight. Their son Jeffrey was born in 1960, but not before the former Mary Bouknight gave birth to her husband's most famously unlucky child in April 1958. Exactly when, why and/or how this marriage ended is not clear, but they appear to have been together at least as late as February 1968. (Note: Indeed, if the family photo prominently featured on Summerlin's 1968 LP, Ring Out Joy, is any indication, Ed and Mary Summerlin were, at that time, not only still married but perhaps even still happy.)

In December 1974, in a ceremony conducted at Ornette Coleman's Artist House in Manhattan's Soho, Manhattan neighborhood (and officiated by, among others, Summerlin's old friend, Roger Ortmayer), Summerlin married Dayton, Ohio native and Ohio University graduate, Karen Louise Jones, then employed as director of communication services for public schools in Hyde Park, New York.

Summerlin died on October 10, 2006 in Rhinebeck, NY after a long battle with cancer, survived by his wife Karen and sons Sean and Jeffrey from the previous two marriages.

== Selected discography ==
=== As leader ===
- Liturgical Jazz (Ecclesia Records) (1959)
- The Don Heckman-Ed Summerlin Improvisational Jazz Workshop (Ictus, 1967), co-led with Don Heckman, featuring Steve Kuhn and Ron Carter
- Ring Out Joy (Avant-Garde Records) (1968)
- Still At It (Ictus 1994)

Recorded at Make Believe Ballroom in West Shokan, New York, Ed Summerlin - Bob Norden Quartet, December 27 & 28, 1993, released 1998
Ed Summerlin (tenor sax), Bob Norden (trombone), Charlie Kniceley (bass), Chris Starpoli (percussion)

- Sum of the Parts (Ictus, 1998)

Recorded at Make Believe Ballroom in West Shokan, New York, released February, 1998
Ed Summerlin (tenor sax), Bruce Ahren (trumpet), Joe Chambers (drums), Ron Finck (alto sax), Tony Marino (bass)

- Eye on the Future (Ictus, 1999)

Recorded at Make Believe Ballroom in West Shokan, New York, December 14 & 15, 1998; released 1999
Ed Summerlin (tenor sax), Bruce Ahrens (trumpet), Bob Norden (trombone), Ron Finck (alto sax), Tony Marino (bass), Adam Nussbaum (drums)

=== As arranger / composer ===
With Freddie Hubbard

- Hub Cap (Blue Note, 1961)

With Steve Kuhn and Toshiko Akiyoshi

- The Country and Western Sound of Jazz Pianos (Dauntless, 1963)

With Caedmon Records

- Winnie the Pooh: Told and Sung (Caedmon, TC 1408; 1972) – words and music by A. A. Milne, Fraser-Simson and Julian Slade, read and sung by Carol Channing; additional music, arrangements and conducting by Ed Summerlin.
- Many Moons (Caedmon, TC-1410; 1972) – James Thurber story read by Peter Ustinov; background music composed and conducted by Edgar Summerlin.
- The Great Quillow (Caedmon, TC 1411; 1972) – James Thurber story read by Peter Ustinov; background music composed and conducted by Ed Summerlin.
- 'Curious George,' and other stories about Curious George (Caedmon, TC 1420; 1973) – read by Julie Harris; background music composed and conducted by Ed Summerlin.
- 'Curious George Reads the Alphabet,' and other stories about Curious George (Caedmon, TC 1421; 1973) – read by Julie Harris; music composed and conducted by Ed Summerlin.
- Whoever heard of a Fird? (Caedmon, TC 1735; 1984) – Othello Bach story performed by Joel Grey; arranged and conducted by Ed Summerlin.

With The Rock Generation

- Saturday in the Park and Other Songs Made Famous by Chicago (RCA Camden, 1973)

=== As sideman or combo member ===
- The Contemporary Jazz Ensemble: New Sounds From Rochester, Prestige Records (PRLP 163) (1953) OCLC 56923930

Bob Norden (trombone), Bob Silberstein (alto sax), Ed Summerlin (tenor sax), Jim Straney (piano), Neil Courtney (bass), Bill Porter (drums)
Recorded in Rochester, New York, June 1953

1. All the Things You Are
2. Fantasia and Fugue on Poinciana
3. Prelude : Go Forth
4. Prelude and Jazz
5. Variation

== See also ==
- One O'Clock Lab Band, Notable Alumni
- List of American composers
- List of City College of New York people
- List of jazz arrangers
- List of jazz saxophonists
- List of music arrangers
- List of saxophonists
- List of University of North Texas College of Music alumni
