= Dat Dere =

Song
- Language: English
- Genre: Jazz
- Composer(s): Bobby Timmons
- Lyricist(s): Oscar Brown, Jr.

"Dat Dere" is a jazz song written by Bobby Timmons that was recorded in 1960. Lyrics were written later by Oscar Brown, Jr.

== Recording and lyrics ==
The song was first recorded by Bobby Timmons in his debut album This Here Is Bobby Timmons (January 1960), and shortly thereafter by the Cannonball Adderley Quintet on the album Them Dirty Blues (February 1960) and by Art Blakey and the Jazz Messengers on the album The Big Beat (March 1960), with Timmons as pianist on both recordings.

Oscar Brown Jr. wrote the lyrics later for his 1960 album Sin & Soul. In 1962 Sheila Jordan recorded the vocal version for her debut record Portrait of Sheila. The song has since been recorded by dozens of performers in both vocal and instrumental versions. Rickie Lee Jones recorded a version for her 1991 album Pop Pop.
