= Playground (Steve Kuhn & Sheila Jordan album) =

Studio album by Steve Kuhn/Sheila Jordan Band
- Released: March 1980
- Recorded: July 1979
- Studio: Columbia Recording Studios; New York City
- Genre: Jazz
- Length: 41:31
- Label: ECM 1159
- Producer: Robert Hurwitz

Steve Kuhn chronology
Non-Fiction (1978)	Playground (1980)	Last Year's Waltz (1982)

Playground is an album by the Steve Kuhn/Sheila Jordan Band recorded in July 1979 and released on ECM March the following year. The quartet features rhythm section Harvie Swartz and Bob Moses.

== Reception ==
The AllMusic review by Scott Yanow awarded the album 4½ stars calling it "Intriguing music".

Professional ratings
Review scores
Source	Rating
Allmusic	4.5/5 stars
The Rolling Stone Jazz Record Guide	3/5 stars

== Track listing ==
All compositions by Steve Kuhn

1. "Tomorrow's Son" - 5:59
2. "Gentle Thoughts" - 7:25
3. "Poem For No. 15" - 7:09
4. "The Zoo" - 4:36
5. "Deep Tango" - 10:43
6. "Life's Backward Glance" - 5:39

== Personnel ==
=== Steve Kuhn/Sheila Jordan Band ===
- Steve Kuhn – piano
- Sheila Jordan – voice
- Harvie Swartz – bass
- Bob Moses – drums
