= The Jazz Professors =

American jazz sextet

The Jazz Professors is a sextet of American jazz musicians who are all both working music professionals in their own right and faculty members of the Jazz Studies program at the University of Central Florida in Orlando, Florida. They release albums annually on the Flying Horse Records label, a professional label within the school. Their first two albums both made the JazzWeek charts, with The Jazz Professors: Live at the UCF-Orlando Jazz Festival topping out at No. 19 in 2012, and their second album, Do That Again (Flying Horse) (2013) charting as high as No. 6 nationally

The group performs with guest artists and orchestras, most notably Kenny Drew Jr. and Michael Philip Mossman.

== Roster ==
- Jeff Rupert, tenor/alto saxophone
- Per Danielsson, piano
- Bobby Koelble, guitar
- Richard Drexler, bass
- Marty Morell, drums

== Former Members ==
- Michael Wilkinson, trombone

== Discography ==
- En Plein Air (album) – (Flying Horse), 2015
- Do That Again – (Flying Horse), 2013
- The Jazz Professors: Live at the UCF-Orlando Jazz Festival (Flying Horse), 2012

== Website ==
Flying Horse https://flyinghorserecords.com/
