= Motility (album) =

Studio album by Steve Kuhn and Ecstasy
- Released: April 1977
- Recorded: January 1977
- Studio: Tonstudio Bauer; Ludwigsburg, W. Germany
- Genre: Jazz
- Length: 44:31
- Label: ECM; ECM 1094 ST
- Producer: Manfred Eicher

Steve Kuhn chronology
Trance (1975)	Motility (1977)	Non-Fiction (1978)

Motility is an album by American jazz pianist Steve Kuhn, recorded for ECM in January 1977 and released in April later that year, Kuhn's second album with his Ecstasy quartet, featuring saxophonist Steve Slagle and rhythm section Harvie Swartz and Michael Smith.

== Reception ==
Professional ratings
Review scores
Source	Rating
AllMusic	3/5 stars

The Globe and Mail wrote that the music "[falls] in line somewhere between Chick Corea (from his early Return to Forever period) and McCoy Tyner, with some of the former's lyricism and a hint of the latter's energy."

The AllMusic review by Ken Dryden states, "This is one of Steve Kuhn's more unusual studio sessions... At times, the pianist seems less like a post-bop musician and more like someone dabbling in new-age music."

== Track listing ==
All tracks are written by Steve Kuhn except as noted.

Side I
No.	Title	Writer(s)	Length
1.	"The Rain Forest"		6:13
2.	"Oceans in the Sky"		5:07
3.	"Catherine"	Harvie Swartz	5:34
4.	"Bittersweet Passages"		4:54
Total length:			21:48

Side II
No.	Title	Writer(s)	Length
1.	"Deep Tango"		7:27
2.	"Motility / The Child Is Gone"		7:21
3.	"A Danse for One"		3:03
4.	"Places I've Never Been"	Swartz	4:52
Total length:			22:43 44:31

== Personnel ==
=== Ecstasy ===
- Steve Kuhn – piano
- Steve Slagle – soprano and alto saxophones, flute
- Harvie Swartz – bass
- Michael Smith – drums

=== Technical personnel ===
- Manfred Eicher – producer
- Martin Wieland – recording engineer
- Dieter Bonhorst – layout
- Maja Weber – cover design
- Roberto Masotti – photography
