= Promises Kept =

Promises Kept may refer to:

- Promises Kept (Champion album), 2004
- Promises Kept (Steve Kuhn album), 2004
- Promises Kept (The Supremes album), an unreleased album from 1971
- Promises Kept, a 2003 autobiography by Sid McMath
- "Promises Kept" (Arrow), an episode of Arrow
