= David Finck =

American jazz musician (b. 1958)

- Born: August 26, 1958 (age 67); Rochester, New York, U.S.
- Origin: Philadelphia, Pennsylvania, U.S.
- Genres: Jazz
- Instrument(s): Bass guitar · double bass

David E. Finck (born August 26, 1958) is an American jazz bassist. He plays both bass guitar and double bass.

== Early life and education ==
Finck was born in Rochester, New York, while his father was attending graduate school at the University of Rochester. Raised in Philadelphia, he graduated from Cheltenham High School. He studied under Sam Goradetzer and Michael Shahan of the Philadelphia Orchestra, and graduated from Eastman School of Music in 1980.

== Career ==
Finck played with Woody Herman in 1980 and 1981 and then moved to New York City, where he played with Joe Williams, Annie Ross, Mel Lewis, Al Cohn, Ernestine Anderson, Rosemary Clooney, Tom Harrell, Jerry Dodgion, Phil Woods, Clark Terry, and Al Grey in the 1980s. He worked with Paquito D'Rivera and Steve Kuhn in the 1990s, as well as Freddie Hubbard, Makoto Ozone, and Eddie Daniels. Finck also featured accompanying André Previn on the 1998 Deutsche Grammophon album release We Got Rhythm: A Gershwin Songbook.

Finck's debut release as a leader, Future Day, was released in 2008 on Soundbrush Records. The album features Joe Locke, Tom Ranier, and Joe LaBarbera, as well as guest appearances from Jeremy Pelt and Bob Sheppard.

== Discography ==
=== As leader ===
- Future Day (Soundbrush, 2008)
- Low Standards (Soundbrush, 2017)
- Bassically Jazz (Primary Wave Music, 2019)
- Over the Rainbow (Macharso Records, 2019)
- Bassic Instinct (Primary Wave Music, 2021)
- A Beautiful Friendship (Burton Avenue Music, 2023)

=== As sideman ===
With Steve Kuhn

- Looking Back (Concord, 1990)
- Years Later (Concord, 1992)
- Remembering Tomorrow (ECM, 1995)
- Dedication (Reservoir, 1997)
- Countdown (Reservoir, 1998)
- The Best Things (Reservoir, 1999)
- Promises Kept (ECM, 2000)
- Mostly Coltrane (ECM, 2008)

With Tisziji Munoz

- Incomprehensibly Gone (Anami Music, 2010)
- Beauty As Beauty (Anami Music, 2013)
- Realization of Paradox: Melting the Mind of Logic (Anami Music, 2014)
- Songs of Soundlessness (Anami Music, 2015)
- Atoms of Supersoul (Anami Music, 2016)
- Scream of Ensoundment (Anami Music, 2017)

With Paquito D'Rivera

- Tico! Tico! (Chesky Records, 1989)
- Havana Cafe (Chesky Records, 1992)

With André Previn

- We Got Rhythm: A Gershwin Songbook (Deutsche Grammophon, 1998)
- We Got It Good and That Ain't Bad: An Ellington Songbook (Deutsche Grammophon, 1999)
- Live at the Jazz Standard (Decca, 2001)

With André Previn and Sylvia McNair

- Sure Thing: The Jerome Kern Songbook (Philips, 1996)
- Come Rain or Shine: The Harold Arlen Songbook (Philips, 1996)
- Thrivin' With Marian Petrescu (Résonance, 2010)

With others

- Jon Benjamin, Well, I Should Have...* (Sub Pop, 2015)
- Badi Assad, Echoes of Brazil (Chesky Records, 1997)
- Mark Murphy, Lucky to Be Me (HighNote Records, 2002)
