= Mostly Coltrane =

Studio album by Steve Kuhn Trio with Joe Lovano
- Released: June 19, 2009
- Recorded: December 2008
- Studio: Avatar (New York, New York)
- Genre: Jazz
- Length: 77:23
- Label: ECM; ECM 2099
- Producer: Manfred Eicher

Steve Kuhn chronology
Baubles, Bangles And Beads (2008)	Mostly Coltrane (2009)	I Will Wait for You: The Music of Michel Legrand (2010)

Mostly Coltrane is an album by jazz pianist and composer Steve Kuhn recorded in December 2008 and released on ECM in June the following year. The album is a tribute to influential sax player John Coltrane, with whom Kuhn performed for a short period in 1960.

== Reception ==
The AllMusic review by Ken Dryden awarded the album 4 stars stating "Mostly Coltrane easily stands out as one of the best CDs among the countless tributes to John Coltrane and is one of Steve Kuhn's essential recordings within his extensive discography."

Professional ratings
Review scores
Source	Rating
Allmusic	4/5 stars

== Track listing ==
All compositions by John Coltrane except as indicated

1. "Welcome" - 5:00
2. "Song of Praise" - 7:31
3. "Crescent" - 6:23
4. "I Want to Talk About You" (Billy Eckstine) - 6:00
5. "The Night Has a Thousand Eyes" (Buddy Bernier, Jerry Brainin) - 8:45
6. "Living Space" - 5:12
7. "Central Park West" - 3:50
8. "Like Sonny" - 6:04
9. "With Gratitude" (Steve Kuhn) - 3:41
10. "Configuration" - 4:19
11. "Jimmy's Mode" - 6:53
12. "Spiritual" - 8:21
13. "Trance" (Kuhn) - 5:24

== Personnel ==
- Steve Kuhn – piano
- Joe Lovano – tenor saxophone, tarogato
- David Finck – bass
- Joey Baron – drums
