= Portrait of Sheila =

1963 debut album by Sheila Jordan

- Cover design by Reid Miles

Studio album by Sheila Jordan
- Released: January 1963
- Recorded: September 19 and October 12, 1962
- Studio: Van Gelder Studio; Englewood Cliffs, New Jersey
- Genre: Vocal jazz
- Length: 39:39
- Label: Blue Note
- Producer: Alfred Lion

Sheila Jordan chronology
Portrait of Sheila (1963)	Confirmation (1975)

Portrait of Sheila is the 1963 debut album of American jazz singer Sheila Jordan, released by Blue Note Records. In the 1963 DownBeat magazine Critics Poll, she was ranked first in the vocal category for "Talent Deserving Wider Recognition". She did not record again as a leader for more than a dozen years.

== Background and music ==
According to the sleeve notes (written by Nat Hentoff), Alfred Lion of Blue Note decided to record Jordan after hearing her sing at the Page Three Club in Greenwich Village, New York, even though the label "had as a policy not recorded jazz vocalists before".

The album's fourth track, "Dat Dere", showcases Jordan's predilection for performing voice and bass duets. According to biographer Ellen Johnson (author of Jazz Child: A Portrait of Sheila Jordan), Jordan originally wanted to devote Portrait of Sheila entirely to bass and voice, but the idea was turned down by Blue Note.

== Reception ==
Professional ratings
Review scores
Source	Rating
The Penguin Guide to Jazz	(Core Collection)
AllMusic	5/5 stars

The album received a four-star rating from Billboard magazine in January 1963. The Penguin Guide to Jazz selected the album as part of its "Core Collection" and gave it a rating of four stars (of a possible four). AllMusic gave the album a rating of five stars (of a possible five), with Scott Yanow writing in his review: "Jordan sounds quite distinctive, cool-toned, and adventurous during her classic date. Her interpretations of Oscar Brown, Jr.'s 'Hum Drum Blues' and 11 standards (including 'Falling in Love With Love,' 'Dat Dere,' 'Baltimore Oriole,' and 'I'm a Fool to Want You') are both swinging and haunting." In the AllMusic listings of "Albums of the Year", Portrait of Sheila is named as one of the highest rated albums of 1963.

== Track listing ==
1. "Falling in Love with Love" (Richard Rodgers, Lorenz Hart) – 2:31
2. "If You Could See Me Now" (Tadd Dameron, Carl Sigman) – 4:32
3. "Am I Blue" (Grant Clarke, Harry Akst) – 4:12
4. "Dat Dere" (Bobby Timmons) – 2:43
5. "When the World Was Young" (M. Philippe-Gérard, Johnny Mercer) – 4:43
6. "Let's Face the Music and Dance" (Irving Berlin) – 1:14
7. "Laugh, Clown, Laugh" (Sam M. Lewis, Joe Young, Ted Fiorito) – 3:11
8. "Who Can I Turn To Now" (Wilder, Engvick) – 3:21
9. "Baltimore Oriole" (Hoagy Carmichael, Paul Francis Webster) – 2:34
10. "I'm a Fool to Want You" (Jack Wolf, Joel Herron, Frank Sinatra) – 4:55
11. "Hum Drum Blues" (Oscar Brown Jr.) – 2:15
12. "Willow Weep for Me" (Ann Ronell) – 3:28

== Personnel ==
- Sheila Jordan – voice
- Barry Galbraith – guitar
- Steve Swallow – bass
- Denzil Best – drums

"Dat Dere" is a Jordan and Swallow duo.
