= Flying Horse Records =

Flying Horse Records is a professional jazz record label operated by the University of Central Florida (UCF) in Orlando, Florida.

Founded in 2012 by Jeff Rupert, it produces records for The Jazz Professors a jazz combo whose 2013 release "Do That Again" peaked at No. 6 on the JazzWeek chart on March 4, 2013, and for the UCF Jazz Ensemble 1 a professional recording band of students from the UCF Jazz program whose first two albums both charted, and "Jazz Town" peaked at No. 35 in 2012.

== Website ==
Flying Horse Records
