= Non-Fiction (Steve Kuhn album) =

Studio album by Steve Kuhn
- Released: October 1978
- Recorded: April 1978
- Studio: Tonstudio Bauer; Ludwigsburg, W. Germany
- Genre: Jazz
- Length: 39:47
- Label: ECM 1124 ST
- Producer: Manfred Eicher

Steve Kuhn chronology
Motility (1977)	Non-Fiction (1978)	Playground (1980)

Non-Fiction is an album by American jazz pianist and composer Steve Kuhn recorded in April 1978 and released on ECM October that same year. The quartet features saxophonist Steve Slagle and rhythm section Harvie Swartz and Bob Moses.

== Reception ==
The AllMusic review by Scott Yanow gave the album 4 stars, calling it "An interesting set of inside/outside music with a bit more energy than the more stereotypical ECM set."

The album was awarded 4 stars by DownBeat. Reviewer Michael Zipkin wrote,"the overall effect is one of dazzling technique and good-natured playfulness".

Professional ratings
Review scores
Source	Rating
AllMusic	4/5 stars
DownBeat	4/5 stars

== Track listing ==
All tracks are written by Steve Kuhn except as indicated.

Side I
No.	Title	Writer(s)	Length
1.	"Firewalk"	Harvie Swartz	8:00
2.	"Random Thoughts"		8:08

Side II
No.	Title	Writer(s)	Length
1.	"Dance with the Wind"	Swartz	5:48
2.	"Fruit Fly"		5:54
3.	"Alias Dash Grapey"		11:57

== Personnel ==
- Steve Kuhn – piano, percussion
- Steve Slagle – soprano saxophone, alto saxophone, flute, percussion
- Harvie Swartz – bass
- Bob Moses – drums
