= Remembering Tomorrow =

Studio album by Steve Kuhn
- Released: April 1996
- Recorded: March 1995
- Studio: Rainbow Studio; Oslo, Norway
- Genre: Jazz
- Length: 68:34
- Label: ECM; ECM 1573
- Producer: Manfred Eicher

Steve Kuhn chronology
Seasons of Romance (1995)	Remembering Tomorrow (1996)	Two by 2 (1996)

Remembering Tomorrow is an album by pianist Steve Kuhn recorded in March 1995 and released on ECM April the following year. The trio features rhythm section David Finck and Joey Baron.

== Reception ==
Professional ratings
Review scores
Source	Rating
AllMusic	2/5 stars
The Penguin Guide to Jazz Recordings	3/4 stars

The AllMusic review by Scott Yanow awarded the album 2 stars, stating "Most of this set is rather sleepy and melancholy, not living up to the potential of these talented musicians."

== Track listing ==
All compositions by Steve Kuhn except as indicated

1. "The Rain Forest" - 4:04
2. "Oceans in the Sky" - 7:58
3. "Lullaby" - 4:52
4. "Trance" - 8:03
5. "Life's Backward Glance" - 5:15
6. "All the Rest is the Same" - 7:37
7. "Emmanuel" (Michael Colombier) - 5:07
8. "Remembering Tomorrow" - 7:55
9. "The Felling Within" - 6:02
10. "Bittersweet Passages" - 4:48
11. "Silver" - 6:53

== Personnel ==
- Steve Kuhn – piano
- David Finck – bass
- Joey Baron – drums
