= Kenny Drew Jr. at Maybeck =

Live album by Kenny Drew Jr.
- Recorded: August 1994
- Venue: Maybeck Recital Hall, Berkeley, California
- Genre: Jazz
- Label: Concord

Kenny Drew Jr. at Maybeck: Maybeck Recital Hall Series Volume Thirty-Nine is an album of solo performances by jazz pianist Kenny Drew Jr.

== Music and recording ==
The album was recorded at the Maybeck Recital Hall in Berkeley, California in August 1994. The material includes some standards, and a composition by Drew's father.

== Release and reception ==
Professional ratings
Review scores
Source	Rating
AllMusic	2.5/5 stars
The Penguin Guide to Jazz	3.5/4 stars
The Virgin Encyclopedia of Jazz	4/5 stars

The AllMusic reviewer suggested that the performance was lacking in emotion: "after a short while, all of the rippling chromatic scales, arpeggios, impressionistic streaks, and showy technical displays become rather wearisome". The Penguin Guide to Jazz praised the playing, while suggesting that "it's time that Drew had the self-possession to let go a bit".

== Track listing ==
1. "Stella by Starlight"
2. "Peace"
3. "After You"
4. "Ugly Beauty"
5. "Well, You Needn't"
6. "Coral Sea"
7. "Images"
8. "Straight, No Chaser"
9. "Waitin' for My Dearie"
10. "Autumn Leaves"

== Personnel ==
- Kenny Drew Jr. – piano
