= Steve Kuhn =

American jazz musician

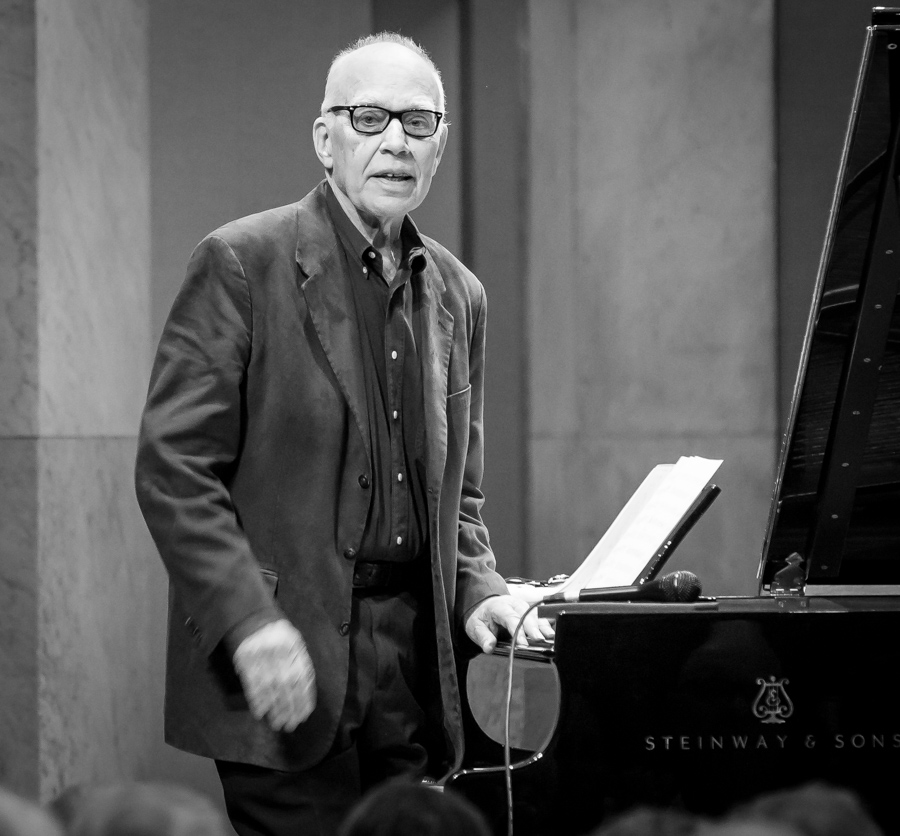
- Kuhn at the Oslo Jazz Festival in 2017

Background information
- Born: March 24, 1938 (age 88); New York City, New York, U.S.
- Genre: Jazz
- Occupations: Musician, composer, arranger, bandleader, educator
- Instrument: Piano
- Years active: 1963–present
- Labels: Impulse!, Buddha, ECM, Concord, Blue Note, Sunnyside, New World, Venus, MPS, Prestige

Steve Kuhn (born March 24, 1938) is an American jazz pianist, composer, arranger, bandleader, and educator. He is the composer of the jazz standard "The Saga of Harrison Crabfeathers".

== Biography ==
Kuhn was born in New York City, New York, to Stella (née Kaufman) and Carl Kuhn, and was raised in Newton, Massachusetts. His parents were Hungarian-Jewish immigrants. At the age of five, he began studying piano under Boston piano teacher Margaret Chaloff, mother of jazz baritone saxophonist Serge Chaloff, who taught him the "Russian style" of piano playing. At an early age he began improvising classical music. As a teenager, he appeared in jazz clubs in the Boston area with Chet Baker, Coleman Hawkins, Vic Dickenson, and Serge Chaloff.

After graduating from Harvard, he attended the Lenox School of Music where he was associated with Ornette Coleman, Don Cherry, and Gary McFarland. The school's faculty included Bill Evans, George Russell, Gunther Schuller, and the members of the Modern Jazz Quartet. This allowed Kuhn to play, study, and create with some of the most forward-thinking innovators of jazz improvisation and composition; it culminated with his joining trumpeter Kenny Dorham's group for an extended time and (briefly) John Coltrane's quartet at New York's Jazz Gallery club.

Kuhn also has appeared with Stan Getz, Art Farmer, Oliver Nelson, Gary McFarland, Ron Carter, Scott LaFaro, Harvie Swartz, vocalist Sheila Jordan, Billy Drummond, David Finck, and Miroslav Vitous. From 1967 to 1971 Kuhn lived in Stockholm, Sweden where he worked with his own trio throughout Europe. In 1971 Kuhn moved back to New York City and formed a quartet but continued doing European gigs and appearing at the Newport Jazz Festival.

In his early years, Kuhn was known as an avant-garde jazz pianist. He was associated with bassist Steve Swallow and drummer Pete La Roca during the 1960s on several notable recordings: Three Waves, under Kuhn's leadership; Basra, under La Roca's leadership, which also featured Joe Henderson; and Sing Me Softly of the Blues under flugelhornist Art Farmer's leadership. Also notable was Kuhn's inclusion in the quartet on the landmark recording Sound Pieces led by saxophonist, composer, and arranger Oliver Nelson and including Ron Carter on bass and Grady Tate on drums. Among other critically acclaimed recordings there was The October Suite composed by Gary McFarland for Kuhn and an ensemble which included strings, woodwinds, and reeds. The Promises Kept album features Kuhn's compositions, piano, and strings.

For decades, Steve Kuhn has led all-star trios that have included such players as bassists Ron Carter, Buster Williams and David Finck, and drummers Al Foster, Jack DeJohnette, and Joey Baron. He has had several live recordings made in some of New York's leading jazz clubs. Kuhn is also the composer of the jazz standard "The Saga of Harrison Crabfeathers".

In late 2022, Kuhn announced that he had retired from touring.

== Discography ==
=== As leader/co-leader ===
Recording date	Title	Label	Year released	Notes
1960–11	1960	PJL	2005	Trio, with Scott LaFaro (bass), Pete La Roca (drums)
1963	The Country and Western Sound of Jazz Pianos	Dauntless	1963	With Toshiko Akiyoshi (piano, cello), Barry Galbraith (guitar), David Izenzon and John Neves (bass), Pete La Roca (drums)
1966?	Three Waves	Contact	1966	Trio, with Steve Swallow (bass), Pete La Roca (drums)
1966–10, 1966–11	The October Suite	Impulse!	1967	Co-led with Gary McFarland (conductor); with Isadore Cohen and Matthew Raimondi (violin), Alfred Brown (viola), Charles McCracken (violincello), Ron Carter (bass), Marty Morell (drums)
1968–07	Watch What Happens!	MPS	1968	Trio, with Palle Danielsson (bass), Jon Christensen (drums); also released as Steve Kuhn in Europe by Prestige
1969–10	Childhood Is Forever	BYG	1971	Trio, with Steve Swallow (bass), Aldo Romano (drums)
1971–07	Steve Kuhn	Buddah	1971	With Ron Carter (bass), Billy Cobham (drums), Airto Moreira (percussion), string quartet
1972–06	Steve Kuhn Live in New York	Cobblestone	1972	Quartet, with George Mraz (bass), Bruce Ditmas (drums), Sue Evans (percussion); in concert; also released as Raindrops by Muse
1974–11	Ecstasy	ECM	1975	Solo piano
1974–11	Trance	ECM	1975	Quartet, with Steve Swallow (electric bass), Jack DeJohnette (drums), Sue Evans (percussion)
1977–01	Motility	ECM	1977	Quartet, with Steve Slagle (flute, soprano sax, alto sax), Harvie Swartz (bass), Michael Smith (drums)
1978–04	NonFiction	ECM	1978	Quartet, with Steve Slagle (flute, soprano sax, alto sax, percussion), Harvie Swartz (bass), Bob Moses (drums)
1979–07	Playground	ECM	1980	Quartet, with Harvie Swartz (bass), Bob Moses (drums), Sheila Jordan (vocals)
1981–04	Last Year's Waltz	ECM	1982	Quartet, with Harvie Swartz (bass), Bob Moses (drums), Sheila Jordan (vocals); in concert
1984–01	Mostly Ballads	Polydor	1986	Duo, with Harvie Swartz (bass)
1986–03	The Vanguard Date	Owl	1991	Trio, with Ron Carter (bass), Al Foster (drums); in concert
1986–03	Life's Magic	Black Hawk	1986	Trio, with Ron Carter (bass), Al Foster (drums); in concert
1988–12	Porgy	Jazz City	1989	Most tracks trio, with Eddie Gómez and Buster Williams (bass; separately), Al Foster (drums); some tracks quartet, with Laura Anne Taylor (vocals) added
1989–09	Oceans in the Sky	Owl	1990	Trio, with Miroslav Vitouš (bass), Aldo Romano (drums)
1990–10	Looking Back	Concord Jazz	1991	Trio, with David Finck (bass), Lewis Nash (drums)
1990–11	Live at Maybeck Recital Hall, Volume Thirteen	Concord Jazz	1991	Solo piano; in concert
1992–09	Years Later	Concord Jazz	1993	Trio, with David Finck (bass), Lewis Nash (drums)
1993–03	In the Shadows	Owl	1994	Co-leader with Carol Fredette (vocals)
1994–04	Live in Japan Vol.1 & Vol.2	PJL	2004	Co-leader duo with Steve Swallow (electric bass)
1995–03	Remembering Tomorrow	ECM	1996	Trio, with David Finck (bass), Joey Baron (drums)
1995–03	Two by 2	Owl	1996	Co-leader duo with Steve Swallow (bass)
1995–03	Seasons of Romance	Postcards	1995	With Bob Mintzer (tenor sax), Tom Harrell (trumpet), George Mraz (bass), Al Foster (drums)
1993–03, 1994–09, 1996–09	In Cafe	Tokuma	1997	Solo piano
1997–09	Sing Me Softly of the Blues	Venus	1997	Trio, with George Mraz (bass), Pete La Roca (drums)
1997–10	Dedication	Reservoir	1998	Trio, with David Finck (bass), Billy Drummond (drums)
1998–09	Love Walked In	Venus	1998	Trio, with Buster Williams (bass), Bill Stewart (drums)
1998–10	Countdown	Reservoir	1999	Trio, with David Finck (bass), Billy Drummond (drums)
1999–12	The Best Things	Reservoir	2000	Most tracks trio, with David Finck (bass), Billy Drummond (drums); one track quartet, with Luciana Souza (vocals)
2000–02	Quiereme Mucho	Venus	2000	Trio, with David Finck (bass), Al Foster (drums)
2000–06, 2000–09	Promises Kept	ECM	2004	Trio, with David Finck (bass), strings
2001–06	Temptation	Venus	2001	Trio, with Buster Williams (bass), Billy Drummond (drums)
2002–05	Waltz - Blue Side	Venus	2002	Trio, with Gary Peacock (bass), Billy Drummond (drums)
2002–05	Waltz - Red Side	Venus	2002	Trio, with Eddie Gomez (bass), Billy Drummond (drums)
2004–02	Easy to Love	Venus	2004	Trio, with David Finck (bass), Billy Drummond (drums)
2005–08	Pavane for a Dead Princess	Venus	2006	Trio, with David Finck (bass), Billy Drummond (drums)
2006–07	Live at Birdland	Blue Note	2007	Trio, with Ron Carter (bass), Al Foster (drums); in concert
2006–08	Plays Standards	Venus	2007	Trio, with Buster Williams (bass), Al Foster (drums)
2007–08	Baubles, Bangles And Beads	Venus	2008	Trio, with David Finck (bass), Billy Drummond (drums)
2008–12	Mostly Coltrane	ECM	2009	Quartet, with Joe Lovano (tenor sax, tárogató), David Finck (bass), Joey Baron (drums)
2010–02	I Will Wait for You: The Music of Michel Legrand	Venus	2010	Trio, with George Mraz (bass), Billy Drummond (drums)
2011–09	Wisteria	ECM	2012	Trio, with Steve Swallow (electric bass), Joey Baron (drums)
2013–10	Break of Day	Meantime	2014	Co-leader with Karin Krog (vocals)
2015–08	At This Time...	Sunnyside	2016	Trio, with Steve Swallow (electric bass), Joey Baron (drums)
2017–09	To and From the Heart	Sunnyside	2018	Trio, with Steve Swallow (electric bass), Joey Baron (drums)

Compilations

- Life's Backward Glances (ECM, 2009) – Solo Piano, Trios, and Quartets with Steve Slagle or Sheila Jordan
- Essential Best (Venus, 2011)

=== As sideman ===
With Stan Getz

- 1961: Recorded Fall 1961 with Bob Brookmeyer (Verve, 1961)
- 1961: At Birdland 1961 (Fresh Sound, 2012)
- 1963: Stan Getz With Guest Artist Laurindo Almeida with Laurindo Almeida (Verve, 1966)

With Steve Swallow

- 1979: Home (ECM, 1980)
- 1991: Swallow (XtraWATT, 1992)

With others

- David Darling, Cycles (ECM, 1982)
- Kenny Dorham, Jazz Contemporary (Time, 1960)
- Art Farmer, Sing Me Softly of the Blues (Atlantic, 1965)
- Don Heckman and Ed Summerlin, The Don Heckman–Ed Summerlin Improvisational Jazz Workshop (Ictus, 1967)
- Jameszoo, Fool (Brainfeeder, 2016)
- Sheila Jordan, Jazz Child (HighNote, 1997)
- Lee Konitz, Pony Poindexter, Phil Woods and Leo Wright, Alto Summit (MPS, 1968)
- Karin Krog, We Could Be Flying (Polydor, 1975)
- Pete La Roca, Basra (Blue Note, 1965)
- Charles McPherson, But Beautiful (Vinus, 2004)
- Bob Mintzer, Bop Boy with Eddie Gomez and Steve Gadd (Explore, 2002)
- Tisziji Munoz, Incomprehensibly Gone (Anami, 2013)
- Oliver Nelson, Sound Pieces (Impulse!, 1967)
- John Rae, Opus de Jazz 2 (Savoy, 1960)
- Pee Wee Russell and Henry "Red" Allen, The College Concert (Impulse!, 1966) – live
- Tessa Souter, Beyond The Blue (Vinus, 2012)
