= The Don Heckman–Ed Summerlin Improvisational Jazz Workshop =

The Don Heckmagn–Ed Summerlin Improvisational Jazz Workshop

Studio album by Don Heckman and Ed Summerlin
- Released: October 1967
- Recorded: September 3, 1965; March 31, 1966; New York, New York, United States
- Genres: Avant-garde jazz, Free jazz
- Labels: Ictus; 101 ictus

Ed Summerlin chronology
| Liturgical Jazz (1959) | The Don Heckmagn–Ed Summerlin Improvisational Jazz Workshop (1967) | Ring Out Joy (1968) |

Professional ratings
Review scores
| Source | Rating |
|---|---|
| Allmusic | 3/5 stars |
| Down Beat | 4.5/5 stars |

The Don Heckman–Ed Summerlin Improvisational Jazz Workshop is the first and only album released by the group of the same name, led jointly by alto saxophonist Don Heckman and tenor saxophonist Ed Summerlin, recorded in September 1965 and March 1966, and released in 1967 on their own, recently established Ictus label, with Heckman and Summerlin each composing two of the album's four tracks. The eponymous LP would be re-released the following year on the English Jazz Workshop label as Jax or Bettor.

Described in Heckman's liner notes as "a laboratory for the continuing exploration of new music," the group existed from 1964 to 1972, "[i]ts materials includ[ing] jazz, electronic music, happenings, theatrical events, dance, film, religious services, written music, improvised music, and chance music." The album also provided an early showcase for pianist Steve Kuhn, as well as bassists Ron Carter and Steve Swallow (the latter heard here approximately five years before switching exclusively to electric bass).

== Reception ==
Awarding the album 4½ stars, DownBeat's Pete Welding described the group's "balance between written and extemporized music" as "both refreshing and successful," while Jazz & Pop proclaimed Heckman "a major voice [who] must be heard," and noted Summerlin's synthesis of Sonny Rollins and Albert Ayler. Decades later, Allmusic's Scott Yanow would give the album 3 stars, citing "impressive solos" by Heckman, "showing that he was one of the first to utilize the innovations of Eric Dolphy in his playing." While the long out-of-print album's "collector's item" status is duly noted by Yanow, the only fault found with the recording is "Lisa Zanda's purposely odd vocal on 'Five Haikus.'"

== Track listing ==
Side One

1. "Jax or Bettor" (Heckman) – 9:45
2. "Leisure No. 5" (Summerlin) – 7:40

Side Two

1. "Dialogue" (Summerlin) – 9:17
2. "Five Haikus" (Heckman) – 6:20

All track information accessed via JazzDiscography.com and the UMKC's Nichols Library collection.

== Personnel ==
Side One and Side Two, track 1 (recorded March 31, 1966)

- Lew Gluckin – trumpet
- Bob Norden – trombone
- Don Heckman – alto saxophone
- Ed Summerlin – tenor saxophone
- Steve Kuhn – piano
- Ron Carter – bass
- Joe Hunt – drums

Side Two, track 2 (recorded September 3, 1965)

- Add Lisa Zanda on vocals and replace Carter with Steve Swallow, and Hunt with Joe Cocuzzo.

All personnel information accessed via JazzDiscography.com.
