= Up Your Brass =

Studio album by Dan McMillion Jazz Orchestra
- Released: November 19, 2002
- Recorded: 2002
- Studio: Morrisound, Tampa, Florida
- Genre: Jazz, big band
- Length: 67:37
- Label: Sea Breeze
- Producer: Dan McMillion, Keith Oshiro, Chad Shoopman

Dan McMillion Jazz Orchestra chronology
Got the Spirit (2000)	Up Your Brass (2002)	Nice 'n' Juicy (2009)

Up Your Brass is an album by the Dan McMillion Jazz Orchestra that was released in 2002 by Sea Breeze Records. By 2005, this was one of five albums the group had released gaining critical acclaim.

== Critical reception and professional ratings ==
Professional ratings
Review scores
Source	Rating
All About Jazz	(very positive)
All About Jazz (2)	(very positive)

"Dan McMillion’s explosive Florida–based Jazz Orchestra is back with another colorful scrapbook of straight–ahead big–band Jazz sketched in the image of his main men, Maynard Ferguson, Buddy Rich and Woody Herman (if one must have role models he may as well choose the best)."

Jack Bowers, All About Jazz

== Track listing ==
No.	Title	Length
1.	"You Got It (Tom Garling)"	4:06
2.	"Spirit of St. Frederick (Nick Lane)"	6:33
3.	"Norwegian Wood (Lennon/McCartney, arr. Bill Holman)"	3:08
4.	"Maria (Leonard Bernstein, arr. Jay Chattaway)"	6:33
5.	"Change Up (Butch Evans)"	5:37
6.	"Dolphin Dance (Herbie Hancock, arr. Bob Mintzer)"	7:12
7.	"Saturnian Sleigh Ride (Shorty Rogers)"	4:15
8.	"People (Merrill/Styne, arr. Don Sebesky)"	3:11
9.	"Last Dive (Matt Harris)"	7:08
10.	"Blues for Red (John Fedchock)"	7:18
11.	"The Chicken (Alfred Jamesner, arr. Kris Berg)"	5:35
12.	"Hot House (Tadd Dameron, arr. Jack Cooper)"	4:04
13.	"Gonna Fly Now (Bill Conti, arr. Jay Chattaway)"	4:27
Total length:		67:37

== Personnel ==
=== Musicians ===
- Dan McMillion – conductor, trumpet
- Pete Mongaya – guitar
- Richard Drexler – piano
- Chris Queenan – bass
- Gerald Myles – drums
- Nemil Chabeebe – percussion
- Saxes and woodwinds – Valerie Gillespie, Mike Bibilisco, Mike McArthur, Tom Dietz, Buthc Evans
- Trumpets and flugelhorns – Chad Shoopman (lead), John Robinson, Andy Reese, Matt White, Wayne Daughtry
- Trombones – Keith Oshiro (lead), Chris Price, Marius Dicpetris, Bob Medlin

=== Production ===
- Recording engineers – Tom Morris, Jim Morris, Mark Prator, Matt Shoopman, Keith Oshiro
- Mastering – Tom Morris, Sonic Solutions
- Liner notes– Alun Morgan
- Photography – Tim Hubbard
- Cover art and design – Scott Howard
