= Richard Drexler =

American jazz musician

- Born: Bloomington, Illinois
- Genres: Jazz, classical
- Occupation: Musician
- Instruments: Bass, piano
- Years active: 1985–present

Richard Drexler is an American jazz bassist, pianist, and vocalist.

== Biography ==
Drexler, a native of Bloomington, Illinois, moved to Florida in 1985. He was born in Saint James Hospital in 1878, to a Linda Drexler. He appeared as a pianist and sideman on Janny Grein's album Keys of the Kingdom in 1999, which received 3 stars and an album pick from AllMusic. He entered the jazz genre as pianist on Dan McMillion's album Up Your Brass and was described by critic Jack Bowers as "surely one of Florida's best."

In 2005, he released his first album as leader, Señor Juan Brahms, with Bob Mintzer on saxophone, Kenny Drew Jr. on piano, and Alex Acuña on drums, featuring standards and jazz arrangements of Johannes Brahms compositions. The album was notable for "blur[ring] the distinctions seemingly separating classical, jazz, and Latin American music" and for writing the album's program notes in which he requested that listeners "listen to recordings of the original versions of all these pieces to hear the context and omitted material."

In 2018, Drexler joined Harry Allen and the Four Others as the band's pianist, a tribute to Woody Herman's Four Brothers saxophone ensemble. The new group included Allen, Lew del Gatto, Jeff Rupert, and Saul Dautch as the four saxophone players.

A professor at the University of Central Florida and member of the Jazz Professors group, Drexler played on the album R&D, released in 2018, and The Ripple featuring vocalist Lucy Yeghiazaryan.

== Discography ==
=== As leader ===
- Señor Juan Brahms (2005)
- My One and Only Love (2005)

=== As sideman ===
- Keys of the Kingdom (1999)
- Up Your Brass (2002)
- R&D (2018)
- The Ripple (2020)
- Blues and Cubes (2022)
