= Trance (Steve Kuhn album) =

Studio album by Steve Kuhn
- Released: 1975
- Recorded: November 11–12, 1974
- Studio: Generation Sound; New York City
- Genre: Jazz
- Length: 38:23
- Label: ECM 1052 ST
- Producer: Manfred Eicher

Steve Kuhn chronology
Ecstasy (1975)	Trance (1975)	Motility (1977)

Trance is an album by American jazz pianist and composer Steve Kuhn recorded over two days in November 1974 and released on ECM the following year. The quartet features rhythm section Steve Swallow and Jack DeJohnette with percussionist Sue Evans.

== Reception ==
The AllMusic review by Thom Jurek awarded the album 4 stars stating "This is jazz that touches on fusion, modal, and the new spirit of the music as ECM came into the 1970s as a player. There is restlessness and calm, tempestuousness and serenity, conflict and resolution, and—above all—creativity and vision."

Professional ratings
Review scores
Source	Rating
Allmusic	4/5 stars
The Penguin Guide to Jazz Recordings	3.5/4 stars

== Track listing ==
All tracks are written by Steve Kuhn.

Side I
No.	Title	Length
1.	"Trance"	5:54
2.	"A Change of Face"	4:56
3.	"Squirt"	3:00
4.	"The Sandhouse"	3:45
Total length:		17:35

Side II
No.	Title	Length
1.	"Something Everywhere"	7:47
2.	"Silver"	2:54
3.	"The Young Blade"	6:15
4.	"Life's Backward Glance"	3:08
Total length:		20:04 37:39

== Personnel ==
- Steve Kuhn – piano, electric piano, voice
- Steve Swallow – electric bass
- Jack DeJohnette – drums
- Sue Evans – timpani, tambourine, maracas, conga, percussion
