= Do That Again (The Jazz Professors album) =

Studio album by The Jazz Professors
- Released: 2013
- Recorded: December 2012
- Studio: Orlando, Florida
- Genre: Jazz
- Length: 61:18
- Label: Flying Horse
- Producer: Jeff Rupert

The Jazz Professors chronology
Live from the UCF Orlando Jazz Festival (2012)	Do That Again (2013)

Do That Again is a jazz album recorded by The Jazz Professors, a sextet led by tenor saxophonist Jeff Rupert. The album was recorded by the jazz faculty of the University of Central Florida and reached No. 6 on the JazzWeek chart.

== Track listing ==
No.	Title	Length
1.	"I Remember You"	4:58
2.	"Where or When"	4:53
3.	"(The Home of) Happy Feet"	5:30
4.	"What'll I Do"	6:04
5.	"Do That Again"	5:55
6.	"Hey, Lock"	5:21
7.	"Cristo Redentor"	5:01
8.	"The New Creole Love Call"	6:36
9.	"El Vuelo"	5:46
10.	"You're Blasé"	5:30
11.	"Two Bats"	5:44

== Personnel ==
- Jeff Rupert – saxophone
- Michael Wilkinson – trombone
- Bobby Koelble – guitar
- Richard Drexler – double bass
- Per Danielsson – piano
- Marty Morell – drums
