= Countdown (Steve Kuhn album) =

Studio album by Steve Kuhn
- Released: February 1999
- Recorded: October 19–20, 1998
- Studio: Van Gelder Studio, Englewood Cliffs, NJ
- Genre: Jazz
- Length: 54:53
- Label: Reservoir
- Producer: Mark Feldman

Steve Kuhn chronology
Love Walked In (1998)	Countdown (1999)	The Best Things (2000)

Countdown is an album by pianist Steve Kuhn which was recorded in 1998 and released on the Reservoir label.

== Reception ==
Professional ratings
Review scores
Source	Rating
AllMusic	4.5/5 stars
The Penguin Guide to Jazz Recordings	3.5/4 stars

The AllMusic review by Michael G. Nastos stated "A neglected figure in the overall scheme of modern jazz, perhaps this magnificent recording from the veteran pianist Kuhn will somewhat salve that wound. He is masterfully impressionistic, skillful as any, extra-lyrical, and his talent is in full array ... This music clearly inspires all kinds of lush, regal imagery. It is Kuhn at his best, one of the more soul-stirring piano trio CDs of recent hearing, and a joy to listen to more than just once". In JazzTimes, Duck Baker noted "Kuhn’s solos are fluid and interesting; he certainly favors long lines and usually manages to make them build effectively. I can’t say that Kuhn has ever seemed to me to be a strongly original voice in terms of harmony, touch, or voicings, and occasionally he gets dangerously over-impressionistic. But some of the best originals here contain surprising moments and the soloing holds up well". On All About Jazz, C. Andrew Hovan said "it's chock full of complexity and substance, yet also very inviting and accessible ... Countdown is a step forward for Kuhn and a valuable addition to this independent's small but substantial catalog".

== Track listing ==
All compositions by Steve Kuhn except where noted

1. "Countdown" (John Coltrane) – 3:48
2. "Chalet" – 5:07
3. "Last Year's Waltz" – 3:26
4. "Wrong Together" (Steve Swallow) – 6:26
5. "Four" (Miles Davis) – 7:06
6. "Why Did I Choose You?" (Michael Leonard, Herbert Martin) – 4:52
7. "When Lights Are Low" (Benny Carter, Spencer Williams) – 6:46
8. "She's Funny That Way" (Neil Moret, Richard A. Whiting) – 4:30
9. "Speak Low" (Kurt Weill, Ogden Nash) – 9:32
10. "Tomorrow's Son" – 3:20

== Personnel ==
- Steve Kuhn – piano
- David Finck – bass
- Billy Drummond – drums
