= David Kane (pianist) =

American pianist

- Also known as: Dave Kane
- Genres: Jazz, classical, film music
- Occupations: Musician, composer, arranger, author, educator, music critic
- Instrument: Piano

David Kane is an American pianist, composer, arranger, author and music critic.

== Biography ==
Kane was born in Glasgow, Scotland, in 1955 and moved to the United States with his family in 1965. He began playing piano and composing music at the age of eight. He attended North Texas State University in 1972. In 1975, he moved to Washington DC, where he studied with Doctor Asher Zlotnik for five years. In addition, he studied with Ludmila Ulehla, Alan Mandel, and Clare Fischer. Kane currently resides in Silver Spring, Maryland.

== Career ==
Jazz pianist

Kane has performed with many jazz artists including Woody Shaw, David Liebman, Marlene VerPlanck, Charlie Byrd, Jim Snidero, Mark Murphy, Eddie Daniels, Dizzy Gillespie, Pam Bricker, Maxine Sullivan, Tom Keenlyside, and Michelle Hendricks. In addition, he has led his own Washington D.C.–based jazz quartet featuring drummer Michael S. Smith, saxophonist Glenn Cashman, and bassist Drew Gress.

Classical pianist and composer

Kane has accompanied many classical artists including the Twentieth Century Consort, the National Symphony Orchestra, Baltimore Symphony Orchestra, Charlotte Church, Joshua Bell, Renée Fleming, Denyce Graves, and James Galway.

Kane has composed a variety of chamber works. His best known piece, Emergence: a Cicada Serenade was commissioned by the Strathmore Center for the Arts.

Film and TV composer

Kane composed music for television and film for over 30 years with over 250 credits to his name. Most notably, he composed music for the National Geographic Channel series Taboo and the Smithsonian Channel's Stories from the Vaults. He composed scores for three films, including the 2004 independent film, Crazy Like a Fox starring Roger Rees and Oscar winner, Mary McDonnell. In addition, he composed the theme music for Public Radio International's monthly documentary program, America Abroad.

Author

From 2006 to 2015, Kane wrote music criticism for Cadence Magazine. In 2021 Jamey Aebersold Jazz published Kane's treatise on improvisation, Playing Outside the Chord

Other work

From 1990 to 2001, Kane was the orchestrator for the US Army Soldiers Show. Kane has also orchestrated for the National Symphony Orchestra, the Maryland Symphony as well as for other film composers.

In 2008, he was one of the primary subjects of Dr. Charles Limb's study on the science of music and creativity.

In 2015, Kane joined the faculty of the University of Arkansas where he teaches the Jazz Masters Program.

== Selected discography ==
As a leader:

- David Kane – March Heir (1988)
- Tekke (with Drew Gress) – Tekke (1989)
- David Kane – Solotude (1996)
- David Kane – Grey Matters (2005)
- David Kane – Machinery of the Night (2007)

As a sideman:

- Denyce Graves – A Washington Christmas
- Pam Bricker and Rick Harris – All the Things You Are
- Capitol Bones – Matt Niess and the Capitol Bones
- Dick Orr – Like an Eager Child
- Craig Fraederich – So in Love
- Si Kahn – Good Times and Bedtimes
- Eddie Vann – New Shades
- Lisa Rich – High Wire
- Mike Thornton – Homeward
