= UCF Orlando Jazz Festival =

The UCF Orlando Jazz Festival is an annual jazz event hosted at the University of Central Florida founded in 2008 to bring world-class jazz to Orlando, Florida, and has appeared twice on Jazz Set, a program hosted by Dee Dee Bridgewater that appears on Sirius/XM Radio and NPR. It is a combination of performances by top artists, the UCF Jazz Ensemble 1, the UCF All-Star High School Jazztet, a national honors-combo featuring top high school jazz students, and appearances by some of the top high school bands in the State of Florida as part of a second-day clinic.

== Guest artists ==
Over the six years of the two-day festival, it has featured guest artists:

- One for All
- Charles McPherson
- Mulgrew Miller
- Terell Stafford
- Lenny Pickett
- Lou Donaldson
- Kevin Mahogany
- Mike LeDonne
- Dr. Lonnie Smith
- Grant Stewart
- Guisando Caliente
- Antonio Hart
- Michael Philip Mossman
- Catherine Russell
- David Hazeltine
