= Kenny Drew Jr. =

American jazz pianist (1958–2014)

- Born: June 14, 1958; New York City, New York, US
- Died: August 3, 2014 (aged 56) St. Petersburg, Florida, US
- Genres: Jazz
- Occupation: Musician
- Instrument: Piano
- Years active: 1970s–2010s

Kenny Drew Jr. (June 14, 1958 – August 3, 2014) was an American jazz pianist. His music is known for its hard-swinging bluesy sound and large, two-handed rooty chords contrasting with fast runs. The son of jazz pianist Kenny Drew, he did not credit his father as an influence.

== Biography ==
His initial study was in classical music with his aunt and grandmother. In his teens he became interested in jazz and pop, but initially worked in funk bands. Later he went into jazz piano and in 1990 won The Great American Jazz Piano Competition in Jacksonville, Florida. Drew continued to perform jazz, but he also performed some chamber music. His style has some similarities to his father's, but is different enough to generally avoid comparison; he was considered the more eclectic of the two men.

Drew attended Iona College in New Rochelle, New York, for a period during 1977 to 1978. There, he became pianist for the Iona College Singers, an entertainment troop promoting the college's name and goodwill among local high schools, retirement homes and the like in the Northeast region of the US.

Drew cited Thelonious Monk as an influence and like Monk often recorded (and performed) solo.

Drew died at home in St. Petersburg, Florida, on August 3, 2014.

== Discography ==
=== As leader ===
| Year recorded | Title | Label | Notes |
|---|---|---|---|
| 1987 | The Flame Within | Pony Canyon | Quartet, with Bob Berg (tenor sax), Charnett Moffett (bass), Al Foster (drums) |
| 1988 | The Rainbow Connection | Evidence | With Terence Blanchard (trumpet), Charnett Moffett (bass), Cody Moffett (drums) |
| 1989 | Third Phase | Pony Canyon | Trio, with Buster Williams (bass), Marvin "Smitty" Smith (drums) |
| 1991 | Kenny Drew, Jr. | Antilles | Some tracks trio, with Christian McBride (bass), Winard Harper, (drums); some tracks quintet, with Wallace Roney (trumpet), Ralph Moore (tenor sax), George Mraz (bass), Al Foster (drums) |
| 1992 | A Look Inside | Antilles | Some tracks quartet with David Sánchez (tenor sax), George Mraz (bass), Lewis Nash (drums); some tracks quartet with Joshua Redman (tenor sax), Charnett Moffett (bass); Cody Moffett (drums) |
| 1993 | Another Point of View | JazzCity Spirit | One track solo piano; most tracks trio, with Eddie Gomez (bass), Bill Stewart (drums) added |
| 1994 | Kenny Drew Jr. at Maybeck | Concord Jazz | Solo piano; in concert |
| 1994 | Portraits of Mingus & Monk | Claves Jazz | Trio, with Lynn Seaton (bass), Marvin "Smitty" Smith (drums) |
| 1995 | Secrets | TCB | Trio, with Lynn Seaton (bass), Marvin "Smitty" Smith (drums) |
| 1995 | This One's for Bill | TCB | Solo piano |
| 1995 | Crystal River | TCB | Sextet, with Michael Philip Mossman (trumpet, flugelhorn), Ravi Coltrane (soprano sax, tenor sax), Steve Nelson (vibraphone), Lynn Seaton (bass), Tony Reedus (drums) |
| 1995 | Passionata | Meldac Jazz | Most tracks trio, with Peter Washington (bass), Lewis Nash (drums); some tracks with strings added |
| 1996 | Reverie | Meldac Jazz | Trio, with Lynn Seaton (bass), Lewis Nash (drums) |
| 1997 | Reverie | Meldac Jazz | With Lynn Seaton (bass), Lewis Nash (drums); some tracks with David Sanchez (tenor sax) added |
| 1997 | Follow the Spirit | Sirocco Jazz | Quartet, with Steve Wilson (soprano sax, alto sax), Lynn Seaton (bass), Tony Jefferson (drums) |
| 1998 | Winter Flower | Milestone | Trio, with Lynn Seaton (bass), Tony Jefferson (drums) |
| 1999 | Remembrance | TCB | With Wallace Roney (trumpet), Stefon Harris (vibes), Santi Debriano (bass), Tony Jefferson (drums) |
| 1999 | Live at Montreux | TCB | Solo piano; in concert |
| 2001 | Autumn | Pony Canyon | Trio, with George Mraz (bass), Tony Jefferson (drums) |
| 2002? | Da Skale | TCB | Daniel Schnyder / Kenny Drew Jr. Quartet |
| 2011? | Duality | Random Act | with Larry Coryell |
| 2012? | Coral Sea | Random Act | Trio, with Jon Burr (bass), Marty Morell (drums); released 2012 |

Main source:

=== As sideman ===
- 1987 Charnett Moffett - The Net Man (Blue Note)
- 1987 Charnett Moffett - Beauty Within (Blue Note)
- 1987 Charnett Moffett - Beauty Within (Blue Note)
- 1993 Hal Melia - Waduyathink (Positive Music)
- 1993 Mingus Big Band - Mingus Big Band 93: Nostalgia in Times Square (Dreyfus)
- 1993 Carl Allen & Manhattan Projects - Echoes of our Heroes (Evidence Music)
- 1994 Steve Slagle - Reincarnation (Steeplechase)
- 1995 Stanley Turrentine - T Time (MusicMasters)
- 1995 Michael Philip Mossman - Spring Dance (Claves Jazz (Switzerland))
- 1995 John Tank - So In Love (TCB)
- 1995 Daniel Schnyder - Nucleus (Enja)
- 1995 Jack Walrath - Journey, Man! (Evidence Music)
- 1995 Ron McClure - Inner Account (Steeplechase)
- 1995 Mingus Big Band - Gunslinging Bird (Dreyfus)
- 1996 Nat Adderley, Jeff Berlin, and Kenny Drew Jr.: Monk in the Sun
- 1996 Mingus Big Band - Live in Time (Dreyfus)
- 1996 Jack Wilkins-Kenny Drew Jr. Quartet - Keep in Touch (Claves Jazz)
- 1996 Ronnie Cuber - In a New York Minute (Steeplechase)
- 1997 George A. Johnson - Turqoise Connection (A Records / Challenge Records)
- 1998 David "Bubba" Brooks - Smooth Sailing (TCB)
- 1998 Warren Vaché - Plays Harry Warren: An Affair to Remember (Zéphyr Records (Brussels))
- 1998 Michael Philip Mossman - Spring Dance (TCB)
- 2000 Daniel Schnyder - Words Within Music (Enja)
- 2000 Paul F. Kendall/Bob Leto - Excursions (Brownstone Recordings)
- 2000 Johnny Griffin - Nucleus (Storyville)
- 2000 Daniel Schnyder - An Evening at Sea (Chiaroscuro)
- 2001 Paul F. Kendall/Bob Leto - Red Top (Brownstone Recordings)
- 2001 Paquito D'Rivera - Excursions (Enja)
- 2002 Cody Moffett - My Favorite Things (TCB)
- 2002 Daniel Schnyder - Songbook (CCn'C)
- 2002 Butch Miles - Straight On Till Morning (Nagel Heyer)
- 2003 Daniel Schnyder/Kenny Drew Jr. Quartet - Da Skale (TCB)
- 2004 Richard Drexler - Señor Juan Brahms (Nicolosi Productions)
- 2003 Martirio - Primavera en Nueva York (Sony BMG)
- 2009 Jeff Rupert – From Memphis to Mobile (Random Act)
- 2010 Daniel Schnyder - Worlds Beyond Faust (Col Legno)
- 2010 Thomas Dobler/Kenny Drew Jr "The Oasis and thé Mirage" . Piano/Vibes .
- 2013 Naples Jazz Orchestra-On a Misty Night (Bob Stone)
- 2017 Kevin Çelebi - Purge Corruption (Nikki & Heidi Records) (posthumous release)
