= Crazy like a Fox (2004 film) =

- Crazy like a Fox theatrical poster
- Directed by: Richard Squires
- Written by: Richard Squires
- Produced by: Patricia Foulkrod; Bill Warrell
- Starring: Roger Rees; Mary McDonnell
- Cinematography: Gary Grieg
- Edited by: Sheri Bylander
- Music by: David Kane
- Distributed by: Delphi Film Foundation (DVD); Sky Island Films (theatrical); Innovation Film Group (theatrical)
- Release dates: October 25, 2004 (Savannah Film and Video Festival); May 5, 2006 (United States)
- Running time: 98 minutes
- Country: United States
- Language: English
- Box office: US$9,376 (United States)

Crazy like a Fox is a 2004 comedy-drama film about a man who is evicted from his eighth-generation family home and farm in Virginia and fights to win it back. The film stars Roger Rees and Mary McDonnell and was directed by Richard Squires with a score composed by David Kane . It was shown at the Savannah Film and Video Festival in the United States on October 25, 2004 and played in three New York City theaters and a movie theater in Sterling, VA from May 5, 2006 to May 18, 2006. It was also released on DVD in 2006 through its production company, the Delphi Film Foundation. The character of "Nat Banks" was inspired by Nat Morison who maintained a gentlemanly character and resided on his family estate, Welbourne.

== Cast ==
Actor	Role
Roger Rees	Nat Banks
Mary McDonnell	Amy Banks
Chloe Squires	Claudia Banks
Cody Wisker	Turner Banks
Mark Joy	John Randolph
Paul Fitzgerald	Will Sherman
Christina Rouner	Ellie Sherman
Myrrh Cauthen	Mary Johnson
Howard Coon	Tick Bean
