= Dedication (Steve Kuhn album) =

Studio album by Steve Kuhn
- Released: 1998
- Recorded: October 6–7, 1997
- Studio: Van Gelder Studio, Englewood Cliffs, NJ
- Genre: Jazz
- Length: 58:28
- Label: Reservoir
- Producer: Mark Feldman

Steve Kuhn chronology
Sing Me Softly of the Blues (1997)	Dedication (1998)	Love Walked In (1998)

Dedication is an album by pianist Steve Kuhn which was recorded in 1997 and released on the Reservoir label.

== Reception ==
Professional ratings
Review scores
Source	Rating
AllMusic	4/5 stars
The Penguin Guide to Jazz Recordings	3/4 stars

The AllMusic review by Ken Dryden called it "a multifaceted trio session" which "opens with a pair of enjoyable originals ... does justice to two compositions by bassist Steve Swallow" and "His fresh, somewhat darker approach to Kenny Dorham's catchy "Blue Bossa" starts subtly but grows in intensity. Nor does the leader ignore standards. His bright, swinging take of "It's You or No One," the lush setting of "For Heaven's Sake," and a loping waltz treatment of "Like Someone in Love " all merit high praise". In JazzTimes, Bret Primack noted "What truly delights on Dedication is Kuhn’s phrasing and elucidation, the ability to make each composition his own. Also notable, the way his sympathetic rhythm section pushes the music and increases the energy level".

== Track listing ==
All compositions by Steve Kuhn except where noted

1. "Dedication" – 6:13
2. "The Zoo" – 5:50
3. "I Waited for You" (Gil Fuller, Dizzy Gillespie) – 5:51
4. "Eiderdown" (Steve Swallow) – 5:38
5. "Please Let Go" (Swallow) – 7:29
6. "It's You or No One" (Jule Styne, Sammy Cahn) – 8:02
7. "For Heaven's Sake" (Sherman Edwards, Donald Meyer, Elise Bretton) – 6:12
8. "Like Someone in Love" (Jimmy Van Heusen, Johnny Burke) – 7:18
9. "Blue Bossa" (Kenny Dorham) – 5:55

== Personnel ==
- Steve Kuhn – piano
- David Finck – bass
- Billy Drummond – drums
