= Lynn Seaton =

American jazz bassist

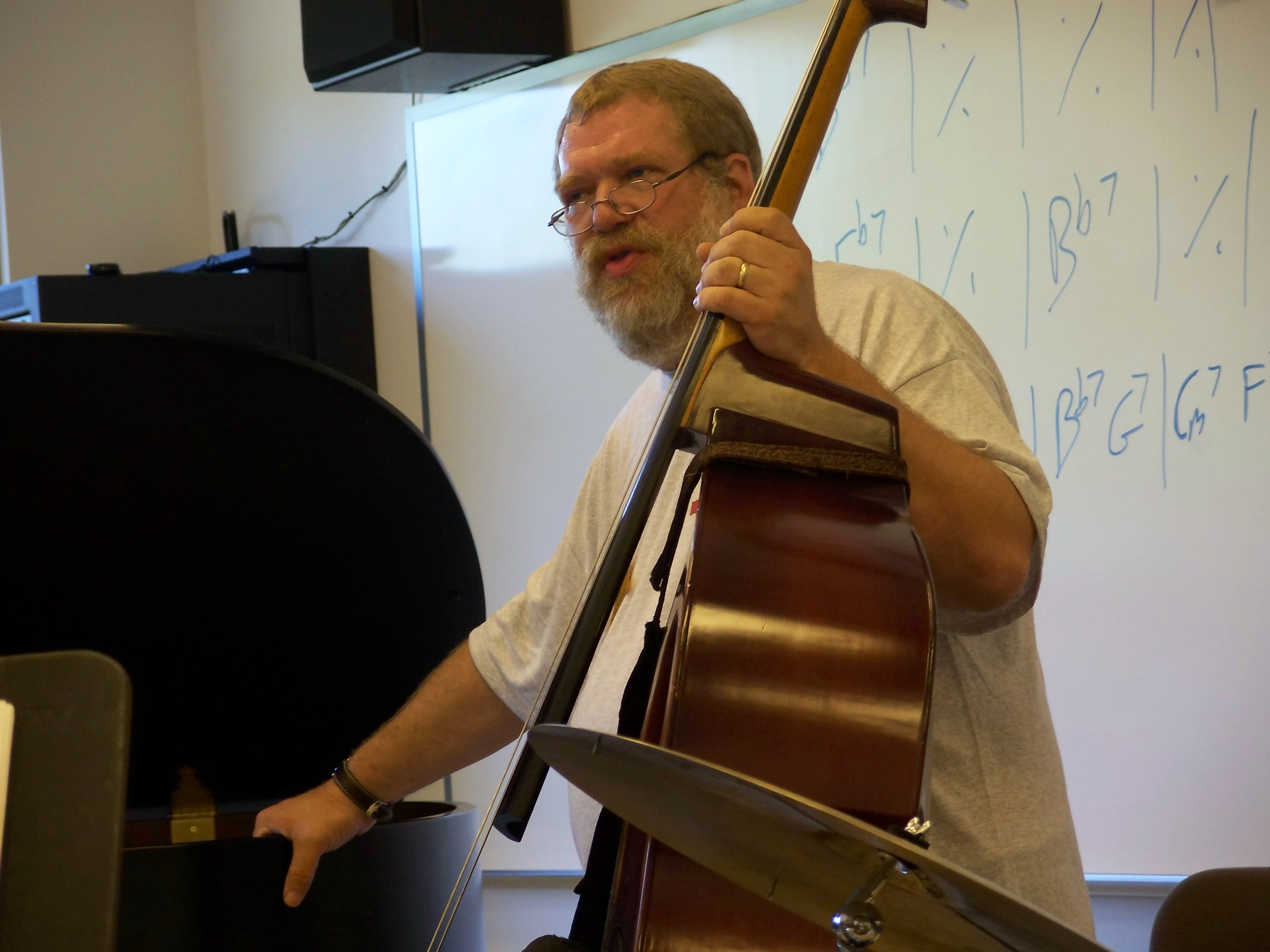
- Lynn Seaton instructing a group of student horns

Background information
- Born: July 18, 1957 (age 67); Tulsa, Oklahoma, US.
- Genres: Jazz
- Instrument: Bass
- Years active: 1978-present

Lynn Seaton (born July 18, 1957 in Tulsa, Oklahoma) is a jazz bassist associated with bebop and swing.

He has appeared on over 125 albums, including Nirvana by Bucky Pizzarelli, and the Grammy Award winning Diane Schuur & the Count Basie Orchestra. He has also recorded as a leader on releases such as Bassman's Basement and Zoom Blewz.

He began with classical guitar, but switched to bass at age 9. He began his professional career after moving to Ohio with the Steve Schmidt Trio, and later he did a two-year world tour with the Count Basie Orchestra. He has performed and recorded with other notable musicians such as Woody Herman, Jeff Hamilton, and George Shearing. He currently teaches at the University of North Texas.

== Discography ==
As leader

- Bassman's Basement (Timeless Records, 1991)
- Solo Flights (OmniTone, 1996)
- Puttin' On The Ritz (Nagel-Heyer Records, 2002)
- Live!!! (International Society of Bassists, 2003)
- Lower Convergence Bass Trio with Jeffry Eckels and Brian Mulholland (Lower Convergence, 2005)
- Zoom Blewz (Lynn Seaton, 2012)

As sideman (partial)

- Woody Herman, 50th Anniversary Tour (Concord Jazz, 1986)
- The Count Basie Orchestra, Long Live the Chief (Denon Records, 1986)
- Diane Schuur, Diane Schuur & the Count Basie Orchestra (GRP Records, 1987)
- Frank Wess, Tryin' to Make My Blues Turn Green (Concord Jazz, 1994)
- Kenny Drew Jr., Portraits Of Charles Mingus & Thelonious Monk (Claves Jazz, 1995)
- Jeff Hamilton Trio, Live! (Mons Records, 1996)
- John Fedchock, On the Edge (Reservoir Records, 1997)
- Butch Miles, Straight On Till Morning (Nagel-Heyer Records, 2003)
- Steve Wiest, Out of the New (Arabesque Recordings, 2008)
- Michael Waldrop, Origin Suite (Origin Records, 2018)
