= The Entourage Music and Theater Ensemble =

The Entourage Music and Theater Ensemble was an ambient music group. The group was active from 1970 to 1983 and performed in theaters in combination with dance ensembles.

The primary members were founder and director Joe Clark on saxophones and keyboards; Rusti Clark (no relation) on viola and guitar; Michael S. Smith on drums and percussion; and Wall Matthews on guitars, keyboards, and percussion.

Entourage formed in Baltimore, Maryland in the early-1970s, relocated to Millbrook, New York, then moved to New London, Connecticut in the mid-1970s and finally re-settled in the Baltimore, Maryland area. The group disbanded after the death of Joe Clark in 1983. Rusti Clark died in 1986, and Michael Smith in 2006.

== Recordings and noted performances ==
In the mid-1970s, Moe Asch of Folkways Records produced two recordings: Entourage (1973) and The Neptune Collection (1975). Both recordings were made available on custom CD and digital download in 2007 by Smithsonian Folkways.

In 1976, noted choreographer Murray Louis commissioned the group to create a two-hour original score based on the ballet Cleopatra for the Royal Danish Ballet.

The ensemble was commissioned by Nebraska Public Television to create a half-hour national television special, Ceremony of Dreams in 1978.

In 2003, a composition from The Neptune Collection, "Neptune Rising", was sampled and used as the basis for the single "She Moves She" by the electronic music artist Four Tet.

== Critical reaction ==
The ensemble received mostly positive reviews. In 1974, a brief write up of the group's first recording in Stereo Magazine praised Entourage as one of the "unique groups since The Paul Winter Consort... a beautiful album..."

In his review of The Neptune Collection, Russell Shaw of Crawdaddy! magazine wrote, "When Michael Smith of Entourage accentuates the eerie 'Druid Dance' with a series of fists, knuckles, and finger pops, he becomes the device the pacing is voiced through. All this is part and parcel of the framework in which Entourage operates; an often sinister, but more often frighteningly intricate series of compositions adaptable for dance purposes. On their own, without visual aid, the recordings are awesomely imagistic; a maelstrom of impressions..."
