= Ecstasy (Steve Kuhn album) =

Studio album by Steve Kuhn
- Released: 1975
- Recorded: November 1, 1974
- Studio: Arne Bendiksen Studio; Oslo, Norway
- Genre: Jazz
- Length: 38:02
- Label: ECM 1058 ST
- Producer: Manfred Eicher

Steve Kuhn chronology
Steve Kuhn Live in New York (1972)	Ecstasy (1975)	Trance (1975)

Ecstasy is a solo album by American jazz pianist and composer Steve Kuhn recorded on November 1, 1974 and released on ECM the following year.

== Reception ==
The AllMusic review by Ken Dryden awarded the album 4 stars stating "Beautifully recorded by engineer Jan Erik Kongshaug, this out of print ECM LP is well worth seeking."

Professional ratings
Review scores
Source	Rating
AllMusic	4/5 stars

== Track listing ==
All tracks are written by Steve Kuhn.

Side I
No.	Title	Length
1.	"Silver"	8:53
2.	"Prelude in G"	4:31
3.	"Ulla"	7:29
Total length:		20:53

Side II
No.	Title	Length
1.	"Thoughts of a Gentleman – The Saga of Harrison Crabfeathers"	12:21
2.	"Life's Backward Glance"	4:48
Total length:		17:09 38:02

== Personnel ==
- Steve Kuhn – piano

=== Technical personnel ===
- Manfred Eicher – producer
- Jan Erik Kongshaug – engineer
- Maja Weber – cover design
- Dieter Bonhorst – layout
- Odd Geir Saether – photography
