= The Flying Horse Big Band =

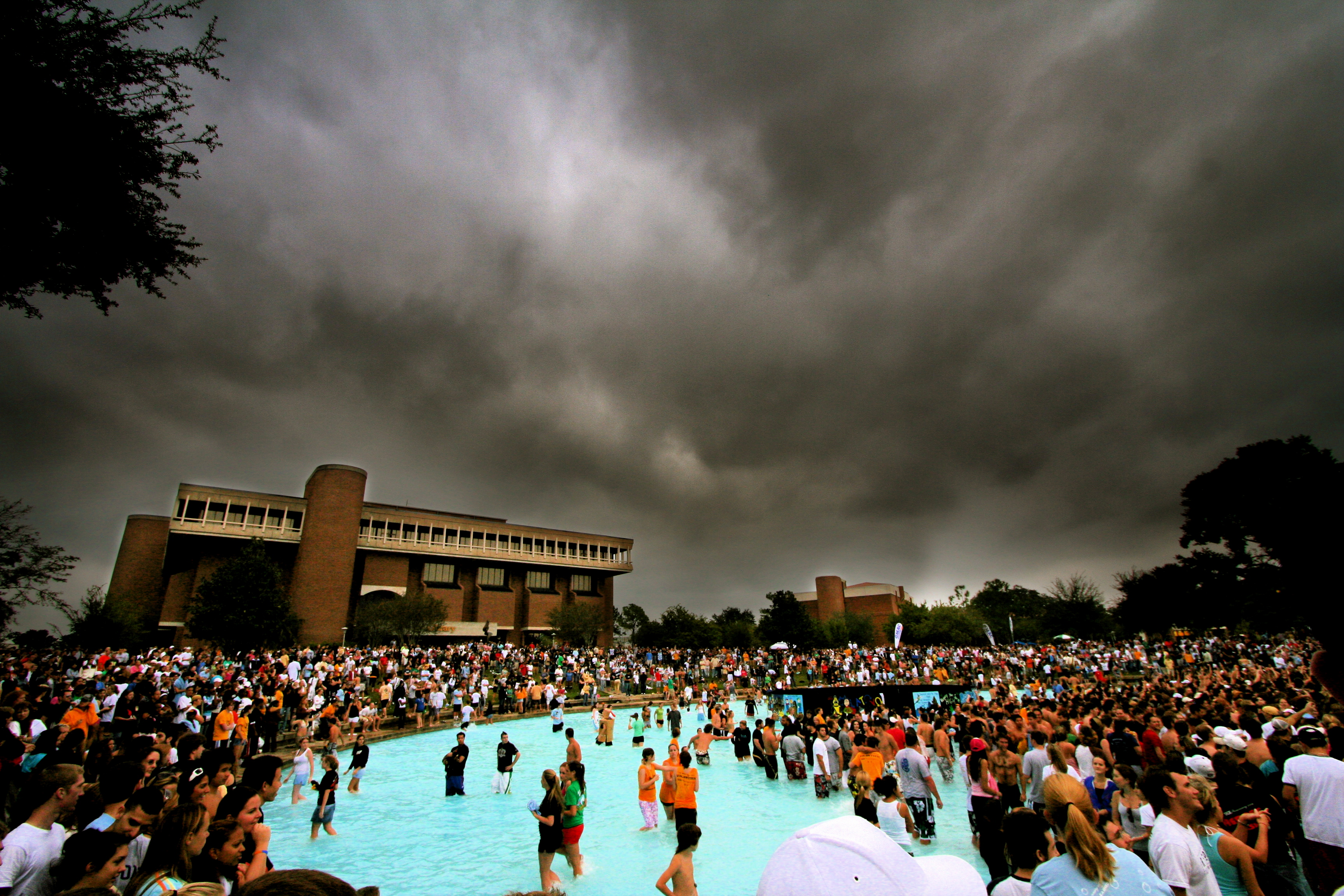
Spirit Splash at UCF (University of Central Florida)

The Flying Horse Big Band is a big band of the Jazz studies program at the University of Central Florida. Until February 2013, it was known as UCF Jazz Ensemble 1. This band has the distinction of being one of the few college groups to have both of its first two professional recordings (2011 and 2012) on the Flying Horse Records label hit the top 50 of the JazzWeek charts.

The Flying Horse Big Band is under the direction of saxophonist, American jazz musician, and professor Jeff Rupert. It has played at music festivals and appears at concert halls regionally and nationally. The band debuted a new composition by Sam Rivers in 2005 that featured Rivers and the RIVBEA orchestra.

In 2005, the UCF Jazz Ensemble I performed a world premier for double big band composed by Sam Rivers.

Their debut album Jazz Town climbed to 43 on the JazzWeek chart in 2011. Their 2012 release, The Blues is Alright topped out at 35th on JazzWeek's chart in March 2013. In 2013, the UCF Jazz Ensemble 1 was renamed as The Flying Horse Big Band. In 2023, the Flying Horse Big Band released A Message from the Flying Horse Big Band as a tribute to Art Blakey and the Jazz Messengers. The release has peaked to 3rd on the JazzWeek chart in February 2023.

== Discography ==
- Jazz Town (Flying Horse) 2012
- The Blues Is Alright (Flying Horse) 2013
- Into the Mystic (Flying Horse) 2015
- Big Man on Campus (Flying Horse) 2017
- The Bat Swings (Flying Horse) 2018
- Good News (Flying Horse) 2019
- Florida Rays (Flying Horse) 2020
- A Message from the Flying Horse Big Band (Flying Horse) 2023
