= Bill O'Connell (musician) =

American jazz pianist, educator, and bandleader

- Born: August 22, 1953 (age 73)
- Genres: Jazz, Latin jazz
- Occupations: Musician, bandleader, educator
- Instrument: Piano
- Years active: 1978–present

Bill O'Connell (born August 22, 1953, in New York City) is a jazz pianist, educator, and bandleader. He is most associated with Latin jazz and hard bop. He studied piano at the Oberlin Conservatory of Music, but has mostly lived in NYC or Long Island. He teaches jazz piano at Mason Gross School for the Arts at the New Brunswick campus of Rutgers University, in New Jersey. He worked with Chet Baker and Sonny Rollins early on in his career. From 1982 to 2017 he has often collaborated and toured with Dave Valentin.

== Discography ==
- 1978 Searching (Inner City Records)
- 1988 Love For Sale (Bellaphon, Jazz City)
- 1993 Lost Voices (CTI Records)
- 1998 The Jazz Slumber Project Directed By Bill O'Connell - Sleep Warm - A Jazz Lullaby Collection (HokanZee Records)
- 2001 Black Sand (Random Chance)
- 2010 Rhapsody In Blue (Challenge Records)
- 2015: The Power Of Two (Panorama)
- 2016: Heart Beat (Savant)
- 2018: Jazz Latin (Savant)
- 2019: Wind Off The Hudson (Savant)

As sideman

With Dave Valentin

Kalahari (GRP, 1984)

Mind Time (GRP, 1987)

With Bill Connors

Return (Tone Center, 2005)
