= Liturgical Jazz =

Studio album by Ed Summerlin
- Released: 1959
- Genre: Jazz, liturgical music
- Label: Ecclesia; ER-101

Ed Summerlin chronology
Liturgical Jazz (1959)	Improvisational Jazz Workshop (1967)

Professional ratings
Review scores
Source	Rating
Down Beat	4.5/5 stars

Liturgical Jazz is the first studio album by tenor saxophonist/composer-arranger Ed Summerlin. It was recorded and released in 1959 on the Ecclesia label.

== Reception ==
Liturgical Jazz was billed as "a musical setting of an order of morning prayer." Down Beat awarded the album 4½ stars, writing that "the combination of music and speech builds to tingling climaxes." It praised in particular Summerlin's deployment of a "drum solo behind the benediction," as well as "the walking bass backing the general confession," noting that these choices are "not only imaginative but also serve a function of greatly enhancing these parts of the service.

== Track listing ==
1. Prelude
2. Collect for purity of heart
3. Hymn of praise: "Love Divine" (Charles Wesley)
4. Service of Confession: Scripture sentences; Call to Confession; General Confession; Prayer of Absolution; The Lord's Prayer -- Service of the Word: Versicle; Venite; Old Testament hymn (Psalm 6); Old Testament Lesson (Hosea 14:1-7,9)
5. Te Deum
6. New Testament Lesson (II Peter 1:3-11)
7. Benedictus
8. The Apostles' Creed
9. Witness to the Word: Sermon
10. Service of Offering: Song Without Words (In place of Anthem); Versicle; Collect of the Day; Collect for Peace; Collect for Grace to Live Well; The Grace
11. After-service: Hymn: "Soldiers of Christ, Arise" (Charles Wesley)

All track information accessed via the UMKC's Nichols Library collection.

== Personnel ==
- Composed and conducted by Ed Summerlin.
- Text read by Roger Ortmayer.

Featured soloists:

- Ed Summerlin – tenor saxophone
- Tom Wirtel – trumpet
