= Harvie S =

American jazz double-bassist

- Born: December 6, 1948 (age 77)
- Genres: Jazz
- Occupation: Musician
- Instrument: Double bass
- Years active: 1972–present
- Labels: Gramavision, Palo Alto, Gaia, Zoho Music

Harvie Swartz (December 6, 1948), known professionally as Harvie S, is an American jazz double-bassist.

He learned piano as a child and did not begin playing bass until 1967, when he was nineteen years old. He attended Berklee College of Music and played in and around Boston with Al Cohn, Zoot Sims, Mose Allison, and Chris Connor. He moved to New York City in 1972, where he worked with Jackie Paris, Thad Jones, Gil Evans, Lee Konitz, Barry Miles (1974–76), David Friedman, Double Image, David Matthews, Steve Kuhn (1977–1981) and Paul Motian. He has recorded extensively as a duet with Sheila Jordan, and has released numerous albums as the leader of his own ensembles, including Urban Earth and the Harvie S Band. Harvie S has recorded, performed and produced music exclusively as Harvie S since 2001. In 2008, he released a duo album with pianist Kenny Barron, Now Was the Time, on HighNote/Savant Records. He has been a member of the Westchester Jazz Orchestra since 2007.

== Discography ==
=== As leader ===
- Bright Dawn (Origin, 2026)
- Underneath it All (Gramavision, 1980)
- Old Time Feeling, with Sheila Jordan (Palo Alto, 1982)
- Urban Earth (Gramavision, 1985) – U.S. Top Jazz Albums No. 24
- Smart Moves (Gramavision, 1986)
- It's About Time (Gaia, 1988)
- Full Moon Dancer (Blue Moon, 1989)
- In a Different Light (Blue Moon, 1990)
- Arrival (Novus, 1991)
- Havana Mañana (Bembe, 1999)
- New Beginning (RVS, 2001)
- Texas Rumba (Zoho Music, 2004)
- Funky Cha (Zoho Music, 2006)
- Now Was the Time, with Kenny Barron (Savant, 2008)
- Cocolamus Bridge (2010)
- Too Late Now (Ward, 2011)
- Yesterdays, with Sheila Jordan (Savant, 2012)
- Witchcraft, with Kenny Barron (Savant, 2013)
- Going For It, with Mike Stern and Alan Dawson (Savant, 2021)

=== As co-leader ===
With Sheryl Bailey

- Plucky Strum (Whaling City Sound, 2015)
- Plucky Strum Departure (Whaling City Sound, 2017)

With Roni Ben-Hur

- Introspection, with Tim Horner (Motéma, 2019)
- Wondering, with Sylvia Cuenca (Dot Time, 2022)

With Yukimi Maeda

- New York Memories, with Sheila Jordan (2023)

=== As sideman ===
With Alan Broadbent

- Developing Story (Eden River/Universal, 2017)
- New York Notes (2018)

With Sinan Alimanović

- Lejla (2020)

With Art Farmer

- Something You Got (CTI, 1977)

With Urbie Green

- Señor Blues (CTI, 1977)

With Jackie and Roy

- A Wilder Alias (CTI, 1973)

With Eric Kloss

- Bodies' Warmth (Muse, 1974)

With Steve Kuhn

- Motility (ECM, 1977)
- Non-Fiction (ECM, 1978)
- Playground with Sheila Jordan (ECM, 1979)
- Last Year's Waltz (ECM, 1980)

With Anders Mogensen

- Live! on March 16th at Jazzhus Dexter (Blackout Music, 2002)

With Mark Murphy

- One for Junior (Muse, 1991)

With Roseanna Vitro

- Reaching for the Moon (Chase Music Group, 1991)

With Suzanne Pittson

- Blues and the Abstract Truth (Vineland, 1992)
