= Steve Kuhn Live in New York =

Live album by Steve Kuhn
- Released: 1972
- Recorded: June 1972; Folk City, NYC
- Genre: Jazz
- Label: Cobblestone; CST 9020
- Producer: Helen Keane

Steve Kuhn chronology
Steve Kuhn (1971)	Steve Kuhn Live in New York (1972)	Ecstasy (1975)

Steve Kuhn Live in New York is a live album by American jazz pianist and composer Steve Kuhn recorded in 1972 and originally released on the Cobblestone label but rereleased as Raindrops on the Muse label.

== Reception ==
The Allmusic review by Ron Wynn awarded the album 3 stars stating "Pianist Steve Kuhn's greatest attributes are his steady, sometimes impressive phrasing and interpretative ability; his weak links are a less than intense rhythmic capability and a derivative style. That's overcome on this session mainly because he's playing with a sympathetic rhythm section".

Professional ratings
Review scores
Source	Rating
Allmusic	3/5 stars

== Track listing ==
All compositions by Steve Kuhn except as indicated

1. "Gloria" (Bronisław Kaper) - 5:05
2. "The Child Is Gone" - 3:00
3. "The Real Guitarist (In The House)" - 7:47
4. "The Saga of Harrison Crabfeathers" - 5:20
5. "Chicken Feathers" - 6:37
6. "Ida Lupino" (Carla Bley) - 4:10
7. "Raindrops, Raindrops" - 4:30
8. "Thoughts of a Gentleman" - 3:06

== Personnel ==
- Steve Kuhn - piano
- George Mraz - bass
- Bruce Ditmas - drums
- Sue Evans - percussion
