= Promises Kept (Steve Kuhn album) =

Studio album by Steve Kuhn
- Released: April 27, 2004
- Recorded: June and September 2000
- Studio: Edison Studios; New York City
- Genre: Jazz
- Length: 58:21
- Label: ECM; ECM 1815
- Producer: Manfred Eicher

Steve Kuhn chronology
Live in Japan Vol.1 & Vol.2 (2004)	Promises Kept (2004)	Easy to Love (2004)

Promises Kept is an album by American jazz pianist and composer Steve Kuhn—credited to Steve Kuhn with Strings—recorded in 2000 and released on ECM in April 2004. Kuhn is backed by bassist David Finck and a fifteen-strong string ensemble conducted by Carlos Franzetti.

== Reception ==
Professional ratings
Review scores
Source	Rating
AllMusic	4.5/5 stars
The Penguin Guide to Jazz Recordings	3/4 stars

The AllMusic review by Thom Jurek awarded the album 4½ stars stating "this is one of the finest recordings Kuhn has ever issued. Simply put, for all the decades spent adventuring on the boundaries where various traditions blur, the pianist and composer articulate direct emotion as the most effective communicator here, no matter what terrain is navigated in form. A breathtaking and intimate outing, this is a career-topping effort."

== Track listing ==
All tracks are written by Steve Kuhn; Orchestrated and conducted by Carlos Franzetti.

No.	Title	Length
1.	"Lullaby"	4:45
2.	"Life's Backward Glance"	5:03
3.	"Trance"	8:12
4.	"Morning Dew"	5:34
5.	"Promises Kept"	5:19
6.	"Adagio"	7:31
7.	"Celtic Princess"	5:10
8.	"Nostalgia"	5:27
9.	"Oceans in the Sky"	5:40
10.	"Pastorale"	5:40

== Personnel ==
=== Steve Kuhn with Strings ===
- Steve Kuhn – piano
- David Finck – double-bass
- Carlos Franzetti – conductor
  - Krista Bennion Feeney, Elizabeth Lim-Dutton, Richard Sortomme, Karl Kawahara, Barry Finclair, Helen Kim, Robert Shaw, Carol Pool, Anca Nicolau – violins
  - Sue Pray, Vince Lionti, Karen Ritscher – violas
  - Stephanie Cummins, Richard Locker, Joshua Gordon – celli

=== Technical personnel ===
- Arthur Moorhead – producer
- Jan Erik Kongshaug, Manfred Eicher – remixing, mastering
- Gary Chester – recording engineer
  - Yvonne Yedibalian – assistant recording engineer
- Sascha Kleis – design
- Liner Notes – Bob Blumenthal – liner notes
- Dieter Rehm – cover photography
- Robert Lewis – liner photography
