= ICTUS Records =

US American record label

- Founded: 1976; 50 years ago
- Founder: Andrea Centazzo, Carla Lugli
- Genre: Jazz
- Country of origin: Italy
- Official website: www.ictusrecords.com

ICTUS Records is an avant-garde jazz record label founded in 1976 by Andrea Centazzo and Carla Lugli.

== History ==
ICTUS in Bologna, Italy

Andrea Centazzo and his wife at the time, Carla Lugli, founded ICTUS in Bologna, Italy, in 1976. Centazzo is a drummer, percussionist, electronicist, and composer. ICTUS folded in 1984 due to financial duress and the divorce of Centazzo and Lugli.

ICTUS in Long Beach, California

Centazzo revived ICTUS in 2006 in Long Beach, California, initially, to raise funds for Bosnian refugees. On January 1, 2006, ICTUS released ICTUS Records' 30th Anniversary Collection, a 12-volume CD retrospective of its work. In 2010, ICTUS released its Ictus 35th Anniversary Collection on 1 CD.

== Selected artists ==
- Derek Bailey
- Kent Carter
- Andrea Centazzo
- Lol Coxhill
- Andrew Cyrille
- Pierre Favre
- Robert Gluck
- Noboru Jones
- Steve Lacy
- Guido Mazzon
- Aran Ortiz
- Gianluigi Trovesi
- Roberto Zorzi
- Rova Saxophone Quartet
- Confusion Bleue (Chris Kelsey (soprano sax), Nobu Stowe (keyboards), Ross Bonadonna (guitars, alto sax, bass clarinet), Ray Sage (drums), Lee Pemberton (sound))

== Other labels and studios by the same name ==
- Free jazz artists Ed Summerlin and Don Heckman recorded three albums between 1965 and 1967 on a label of the same name; but that label was not affiliated with that of this article.
- Producciones Ictus, a.k.a. ICTUS Studios, is based in Mexico City and is not affiliated
