= Jeff Rupert =

American performing artist and record producer

- Born: September 6, 1964 (age 61)
- Genres: Jazz
- Instruments: Tenor saxophone; alto saxophone; clarinet; flute
- Member of: The Jazz Professors

Jeff Rupert (born September 6, 1964) is an American jazz saxophonist and professor at the University of Central Florida (UCF).

== Career ==
Rupert received his master's degree in Jazz Studies from Mason Gross School of the Arts, Rutgers University in 1993, and his Bachelor of Music in Jazz Studies from Mason Gross School of the Arts in 1987. He joined the Sam Rivers Band in 1996, recorded four albums with the band, and performed at Lincoln Center for Ed Bradley's Jazz from Lincoln Center, Vision Festival, and Columbia University. He played with Ronnie Burrage in 2004.

He has worked with Benny Carter, Maynard Ferguson, Diane Schuur, Mel Tormé, Ernestine Anderson, Judy Carmichael, Kenny Drew Jr., Ray Drummond, Joe Farnsworth, Benny Green, Kevin Mahogany, and Michael Philip Mossman.

At UCF, he is the musical director of The Flying Horse Big Band, which began as the UCF Jazz Ensemble 1. He founded Flying Horse Records to promote the work of students and faculty. He has produced several records featuring his students in the UCF Jazz Ensemble 1. Their recording, Jazz Town reached No. 43 on the JazzWeek chart. The Blues Is Alright, the 2013 album, reached No. 35. He founded the band Jeff Rupert + Dirty Martini with which he recorded the album Save Your Love for Me (2004). He led The Jazz Professors, a sextet which had albums on the JazzWeek chart in 2012 and 2013. The Jazz Professors: Live at the UCF-Orlando Jazz Festival (Flying Horse, 2011) peaked at No. 19.

Rupert founded and produced the UCF Orlando Jazz Festival, which has been broadcast by Dee Dee Bridgewater on her Jazz Set program on Sirius/XM radio and NPR.

He was selected to perform in the Jaguar International Jazz Series in New Zealand where he worked with Joe La Barbera, Larry Koonse, John Fedchock, and Tom Warrington.

In 2024, he released the album It Gets Better with pianist Kenny Barron, bassist Peter Washington, and drummer Joe Farnsworth, with critic Russell Perry writing, "Saxophonist Jeff Rupert brings Stan Getz to mind and a smile to my face. He has a very pure tone that sings in the upper register and uses vibrato only sparingly and to great effect by contrast."
