= Robert Hurwitz =

President of Nonesuch Records
- In office 1984–2017

Personal details
- Born: 1949 (age 75–76)
- Education: University of California, Berkeley
- Occupation: Music Executive

Robert Hurwitz (born 1949) was president of Nonesuch Records from 1984 to 2017. He was named Chairman Emeritus of Nonesuch Records in January 2017. He previously ran the American operations of ECM Records, after beginning his career at Columbia Records. Hurwitz grew up in Los Angeles, where he was trained as a pianist and graduated from Alexander Hamilton High School in 1967, then went on to study at the University of California, Berkeley.

Founded as a classical label in 1964, Nonesuch expanded into the world music field in 1967 with its Explorer series. Since Hurwitz became head of the company, it has further expanded its mission to include artists from a wide range of musical genres, including jazz, musical theater, folk, bluegrass, and rock.

Among the artists he has signed or worked with are composers including John Adams, Timo Andres, Louis Andriessen, Henryk Górecki, Philip Glass, Ástor Piazzolla, Steve Reich, Stephen Sondheim, and John Zorn as well as performers and songwriters including Björk, Jeremy Denk, Bill Frisell, Richard Goode, Lorraine Hunt Lieberson, Kronos Quartet, Gidon Kremer, k.d. lang, Audra McDonald, Fred Hersch, Brad Mehldau, Pat Metheny, Punch Brothers, Randy Newman, Joshua Redman, Fernando Otero, Chris Thile, Dawn Upshaw, and Caetano Veloso. During this time, the label’s artist roster has grown to also include Laurie Anderson, The Black Keys, Buena Vista Social Club, Carolina Chocolate Drops, Ry Cooder, Emmylou Harris, and Wilco, among many others.

Hurwitz has produced recordings by Caetano Veloso, Stephen Sondheim, Astor Piazzolla, and Teresa Stratas, and was the producer of the 1993 film George Balanchine’s The Nutcracker. Nonesuch releases have won 42 Grammy Awards during his tenure.

Robert Hurwitz has taught a course at The New School in New York City since 2006.

In a July 1998 article on Hurwitz and Nonesuch Records, the Boston Globe’s Ed Siegel wrote: “Under Robert Hurwitz, Nonesuch Records has been an oasis of artistic excitement. When one picks up a Nonesuch CD, there is a sense of occasion, the feeling that the artists in question have been assembled not as an exercise in star power, but as an exercise in artistic exploration.”

An October 2004 New York Times Magazine profile written by Russell Shorto states: “In a business now largely run by accountants and M.B.A.’s, Hurwitz is, in the words of Stephen Sondheim, ‘one of the few left who practice the making of records as a craft.’”
