= Sheila Jordan =

American jazz singer and songwriter (1928–2025)

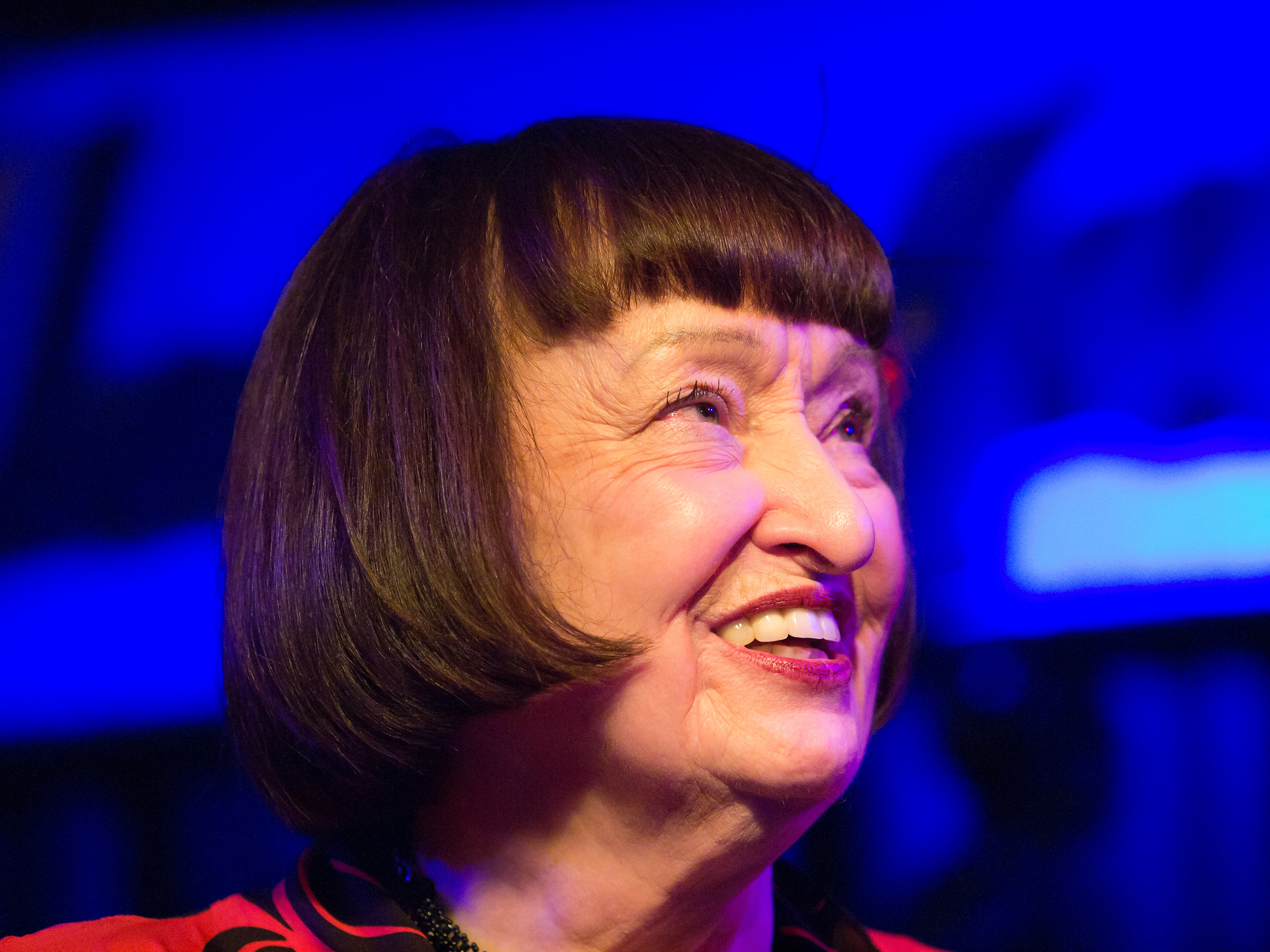
- Jordan in 2011

Background information
- Born: Sheila Jeanette Dawson; November 18, 1928; Detroit, Michigan, U.S.
- Died: August 11, 2025 (aged 96) New York City, U.S.
- Genres: Jazz; free jazz
- Occupation: Musician; singer; songwriter
- Instruments: Vocals; piano
- Labels: Blue Note; SteepleChase; HighNote; ECM; East Wind; Palo Alto; Muse; Justin Time
- Spouse: Duke Jordan (m. 1952; div. 1962)
- Website: www.sheilajordanjazz.net

Sheila Jeannette Jordan (née Dawson; November 18, 1928 – August 11, 2025) was an American jazz singer and songwriter. She recorded as a session musician with an array of critically acclaimed artists in addition to recording her own albums. Jordan pioneered a bebop and scat jazz singing style, with an upright bass as the only accompaniment. Jordan's music has earned praise from many critics, particularly for her ability to improvise lyrics; Scott Yanow described her as "one of the most consistently creative of all jazz singers". Charlie Parker often introduced Jordan as "the lady with the million dollar ears".

== Life and career ==
=== Early career ===
Sheila Jeanette Dawson was born in Detroit, on November 18, 1928. Her father left soon after her birth and remarried. (She later met her half-siblings.) Her mother struggled with alcoholism, and she was soon sent to live with her maternal grandparents in Summerhill, Pennsylvania, a small coal mining town in the Allegheny Mountains. Her grandparents raised her with little warmth or affection, and her grandfather also struggled with alcoholism. She recalled their hardship and poverty:

We were probably the poorest people in a poor town [...]. [... W]e had an outhouse and no water in the house [...]. In the wintertime [we'd] sleep in one bedroom without any sheets or pillowcases on the beds; we just had blankets.

Jordan returned to live with her mother in Detroit by 1942, performing as a jazz club singer and pianist. She helped write lyrics to Charlie Parker's music in the trio Skeeter, Mitch, and Jean (Skeeter Spight, Leroi Mitchell, and Sheila "Jean"). They met Parker at his Detroit performances, and he invited them to sing.

Jordan moved to New York City in 1951, studying music theory with Lennie Tristano and Charles Mingus. She focused on the music of Parker, whom she befriended and considered a teacher, later recalling: "I guess I was chasin' the Bird [Parker]." Asked if the song "Chasin' the Bird" was written for her, she said: "No. I don't know how that rumor got started." In 1952, she married a Parker bandmate, pianist Duke Jordan.

=== Later career (1960–2025) ===
In the early 1960s, she performed at the Page Three Club in Greenwich Village with pianist Herbie Nichols and at other New York venues. Duke Jordan's heroin addiction contributed to their 1962 divorce, but they had a daughter, Tracey, whom she "could truly love" and was "sure would love me back". Jordan partly withdrew from clubs in the 1960s to raise Tracey, and sang in church instead. She worked as a typist and legal secretary for 20 years, with less time for music until she was aged 58. In 1962, she recorded "You Are My Sunshine" with George Russell on his album The Outer View (Riverside) and also recorded her debut album Portrait of Sheila, released on Blue Note in 1963. She began a long collaboration with Steve Kuhn in the early 1960s and played with Don Heckman (1967–68), Lee Konitz (1972), and Roswell Rudd (1972–75).

In 1974, Jordan was Artist-in-Residence at the City College of New York, and taught there from 1978 to 2005. She received the Manhattan Association of Cabarets & Clubs (MAC) Lifetime Achievement Award in 2006, while celebrating 28 years as an adjunct professor of music. She also taught at the University of Massachusetts at Amherst and the Vermont Jazz Center, Interplay Jazz and Arts, as well as teaching international workshops.

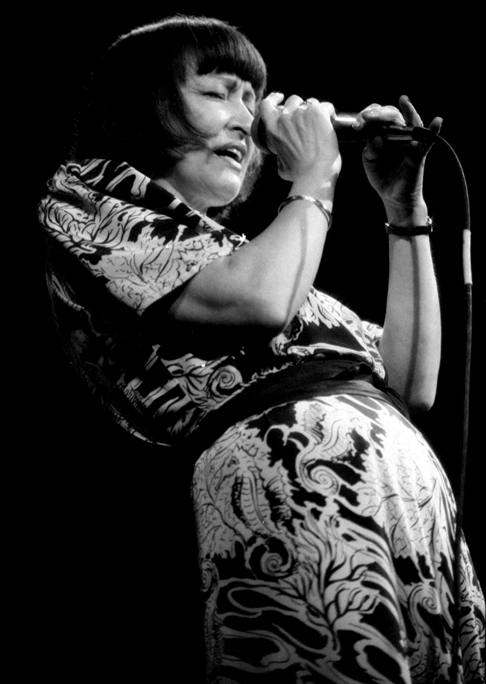
Jordan performing in 1985

On July 12, 1975, she recorded Confirmation. One year later she released the duet album Sheila, with Arild Andersen for SteepleChase. In 1979, she founded a quartet with Steve Kuhn, Harvie S, and Bob Moses. During the 1980s, she worked with Harvie S as a duo and played on several records with him. Until 1987 she worked in an advertising agency and recorded Lost and Found in 1989.

Jordan was a songwriter who worked in bebop and free jazz. In addition to the aforementioned musicians, she recorded with the George Gruntz Concert Jazz Band, Cameron Brown, Carla Bley, and Steve Swallow. Jordan led recordings for Blue Note, East Wind, ECM, Grapevine, Muse, Palo Alto, and SteepleChase.

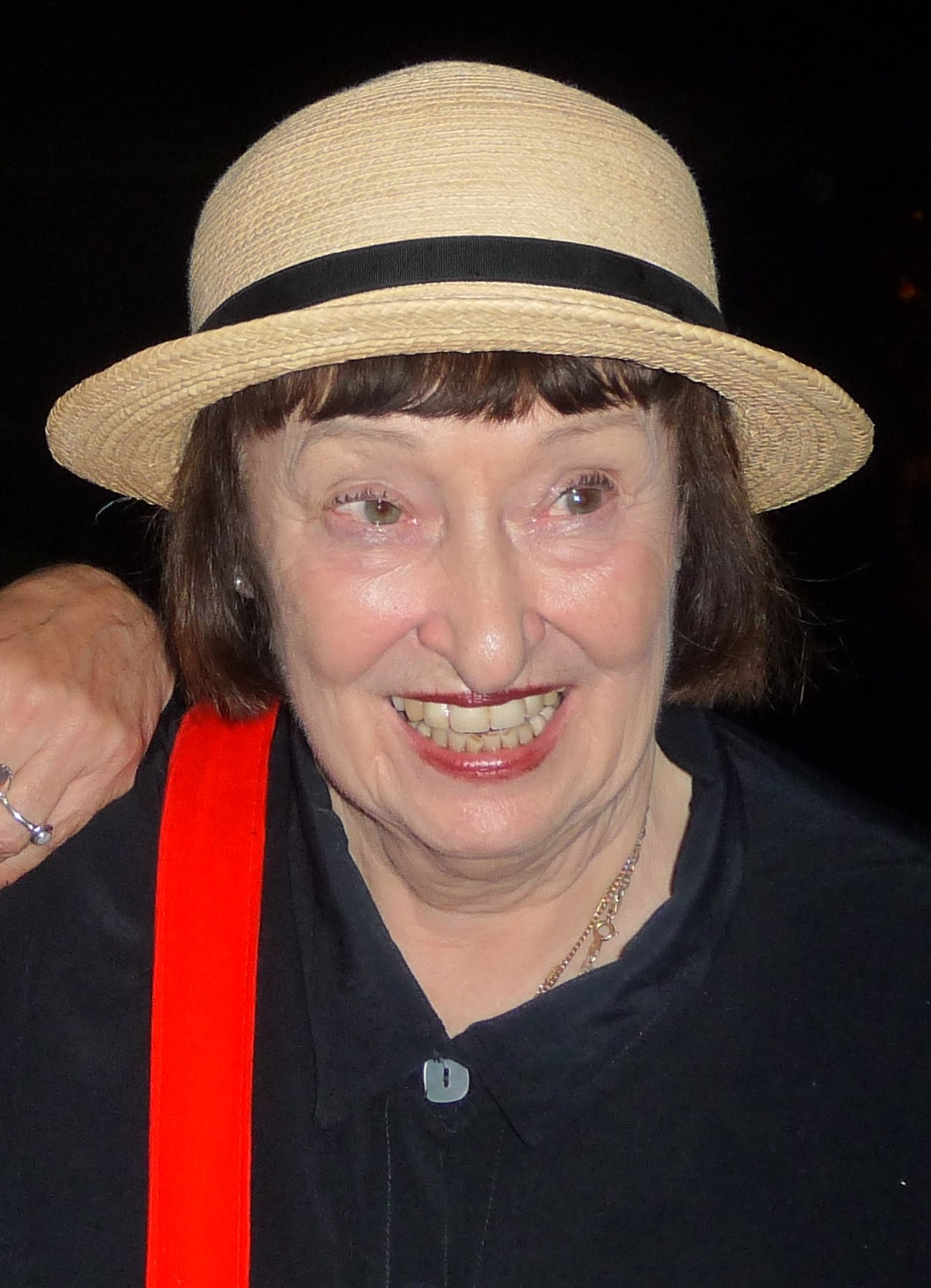
Jordan in 2011

In 2012, she received the NEA Jazz Masters Award. Her biography, Jazz Child: A Portrait of Sheila Jordan, written by vocalist and educator Ellen Johnson, was published in 2014. Jordan describes her own struggles with addiction in the book.

Jordan died at her apartment in New York City, on August 11, 2025, at the age of 96.

== Awards and honors ==
- 2006: Manhattan Association of Cabarets & Clubs Lifetime Achievement Award
- 2007: International Association for Jazz Education Humanitarian Award
- 2008: Mary Lou Williams Award for Lifetime of Service to Jazz
- 2010: New York Nightlife Award – Outstanding Jazz Vocalist
- 2012: National Endowment for the Arts Jazz Master Award – Lifetime Honors Award
- 2018: Bistro Award Outstanding Contributions to the Art of Jazz
- 2026: DownBeat Jazz Hall of Fame

== Discography ==
=== As leader ===
- Looking out (1961)
- Portrait of Sheila (Blue Note, 1963) – recorded in 1962
- Confirmation (East Wind, 1975)
- Sheila, with Johnny Knapp (Grapevine, 1977)
- Sheila, with Arild Andersen (SteepleChase, 1978) – recorded in 1977
- Playground with Steve Kuhn (ECM, 1980) – recorded in 1979
- Last Year's Waltz (ECM, 1981)
- Old Time Feeling, with Harvie S (Palo Alto, 1983) – recorded in 1982
- The Crossing (BlackHawk, 1984)
- Songs from Within, with Harvie Swartz (MA, 1989)
- Lost and Found (Muse, 1989)
- One for Junior, with Mark Murphy (Muse, 1991)
- Heart Strings (Muse, 1993)
- Jazz Child, with Steve Kuhn (HighNote, 1999)
- Sheila's Back in Town (Splasc(h), 1999)
- The Very Thought of Two, with Harvie Swartz (MA, 2000)
- Little Song, with Steve Kuhn (HighNote, 2003)
- Celebration, with Cameron Brown (HighNote, 2005)
- Winter Sunshine (Justin Time, 2008)
- Yesterdays (HighNote, 2012) – recorded in 1990
- Live At Mezzrow (Cellar Live, 2022) – live recorded in 2021
- Comes Love: Lost Session 1960 (Capri, 2021)
- trioTrio Meets Sheila Jordan (SteepleChase, 2022)
- Portrait Now (Dot Time, 2025)

=== As featured vocalist ===
With Carla Bley

- Escalator over the Hill (JCOA, 1971)

With Cameron Brown

- Here and How! (OmniTone 1997)
- I've Grown Accustomed to the Bass (HighNote, 2000)

With George Gruntz

- Theatre (ECM, 1983)

With Bill Kirchner Nonet

- One Starry Night (Jazzheads, 2010)

With Bob Moses

- When Elephants Dream of Music (Rykodisc, 1982)

With Roswell Rudd

- Flexible Flyer (Arista/Freedom 1974)
- Blown Bone (Philips, 1979)
- Broad Strokes (Knitting Factory, 2000)

With Steve Swallow

- Home (ECM, 1980)

With Harvie Swartz

- More Mistletoe Magic (Palo Alto Records PA 8047, 1985)

== Academia ==
Former students

- Laura Valle
