= Don Heckman =

American saxophonist (1930–2020)

Donald J. Heckman (December 18, 1930 – November 14, 2020) was an American jazz saxophonist, music critic, music journalist, writer on jazz, composer, television screenwriter, and clinical psychologist.

== Biography ==
Donald J. Heckman was born on December 18, 1930 in Reading, Pennsylvania. He grew up in Miami, Florida. He began taking clarinet lessons at the age of 12, and was a self-taught saxophonist. He was active performer in the avant-garde jazz and free jazz music scene in New York City during the 1950s during which time he began a concurrent career as a music writer. He returned to Florida to study music at Florida State University; graduating with a Bachelor of Music in music theory in 1961.

From 1961 to 1963 Heckman played in a trio with pianist John Benson Brooks which focused on playing music using twelve-tone technique and improvisation. He simultaneously began writing for DownBeat, Jazz Review, Metronome; writing several pieces with a music analysis bent which was unusual in jazz journalism of the period. He also played with trumpeter Don Ellis. In 1963-1964 he had his own jazz radio program on WBAI-FM, and he was a performer at the October Revolution in Jazz in 1964.

Heckman formed his own band with Ed Summerlin; co-leading the The Don Heckman–Ed Summerlin Improvisational Jazz Workshop from 1964 to 1972. From 1968 to 1972 he was a member of the music faculty at City College of New York, and from 1970 to 1973 he was a music writer for The New York Times. In 1973-1974 he worked for RCA Victor in New York, and he also wrote articles as a freelance jazz writer for Stereo Review, Saturday Review, and the Village Voice during the 1970s.

In 1976 Heckman relocated to Los Angeles; a move which was made after his wife, television producer Faith Frenz, was hired by CBS. In L. A. he composed music for television and wrote drama scripts. He began writing for the Los Angeles Times (LAT) in 1986, and succeeded Leonard Feather as LAT's jazz critic in 1995. He was a regular contributor to LAT until 2008. He was a member of the Jazz Journalists Association, and continued to write music articles until 2016.

In addition to being a jazz writer, Heckman was worked as a clinical psychologist after graduating with a master's degree in clinical psychology from Antioch University in 1994.

He died November 14, 2020. He had one daughter, Allegra T. Heckman.
