= This Could Be the Start of Something (album) =

1958 studio album by Mark Murphy

Studio album by Mark Murphy
- Released: 1959
- Recorded: 1958
- Studio: Capitol Studios
- Genre: Vocal jazz
- Length: 35:45
- Label: Capitol
- Producer: Tom Morgan

Mark Murphy chronology
Let Yourself Go (1957)	This Could Be the Start of Something (1959)	Mark Murphy's Hip Parade (1960)

This Could Be the Start of Something is a studio album by Mark Murphy.

This Could Be the Start of Something is the third album by American jazz vocalist Mark Murphy and his first of three for Capitol Records. It was recorded in 1958 when Murphy was 26 years old and released by the Capitol Records label in the United States in 1959. The album is a collection of standards performed with a jazz band.

== Background ==
Capitol Records producer Tom Morgan signed Murphy to a three-album contract when Murphy was on the West Coast in 1958 on the basis of the two albums he recorded for Milt Gabler of Decca Records. Murphy told Will Friedwald that he went to California in 1958 "looking for places to work. Instead, to his surprise, instead of getting gigs, he got the chance to make the three albums for Capitol".

James Gavin tells the story that Murphy's career was floundering. He was staying at the YMCA while searching for work as a singer. Murphy remembered getting his second break in 1958, "The year I was starving in Hollywood - literally. As soon as I signed the contract I went over to this cafeteria, just sliced that turkey, and ate an enormous meal." Gavin said, "Walking back to the Y, he fantasized about becoming the male version of his idol Peggy Lee, who combined pop stardom with an illustrious jazz reputation".

The title song by Steve Allen was a minor hit for Murphy. Murphy made several appearances on Steve Allen's TV shows during this period, The Tonight Show, and later The Steve Allen Playhouse.

== Recording ==
The arrangements for this release were done by Bill Holman. Holman was Murphy's own choice for musical director for the album, who Murphy was aware of from his work with Stan Kenton and who was a favorite of Peggy Lee. Bill Holman described Murphy's role in the arranging process in the liner notes. He wrote, "First, being a good piano player, he went into the Capitol studios and recorded a demonstration of each tune the way he heard it, accompanying himself. Second, he knew the exact feeling he wanted on each section of each tune. For example, he was able to indicate where the conga drum should or should not be used to get the sound he wanted . . . equal arranging credit should go to him".

Morgan and Holman assembled a band of top notch West Coast jazz musicians. Pianist Jimmy Rowles was an in-demand accompanist for singers such as Billie Holiday, Ella Fitzgerald, Jo Stafford, Anita O'Day, and Julie London. Rowles along with bassist Joe Mondragon and drummer Mel Lewis formed Peggy Lee's rhythm section and were hired for the recording date. The trumpeters and brothers Pete and Conte Candoli were hired. The recording was done in two separate sessions on two days in December 1958. A full band recorded the seven-song medley for Side 2 on the initial session and then two weeks later, with a smaller line-up, six more tunes were recorded for Side 1, including the title track, with Richie Kamuca on tenor saxophone and Bobbie Gibbons on guitar.

== Reception ==
Professional ratings
Review scores
Source	Rating
AllMusic	3/5 stars
The Virgin Encyclopedia of Popular Music	3/5 stars
DownBeat	3/5 stars

AllMusic assigns the album 3 stars. Scott Yanow writes, "Murphy sings well, if conventionally . . . Bill Holman provided the swinging arrangements. A good start to a major career".

Colin Larkin assigns the record 3 stars in The Virgin Encyclopedia of Popular Music. Three stars means, "Good. By the artist's usual standards and therefore recommended".

Murphy biographer Peter Jones says the album is "rather uneven, and on some tunes one feels that Mark's heart isn't in it. But Holman and Murphy's arrangements work well . . . there are some misfires on the album". Side two of the album is an extended medley of songs. "The idea of doing a 20-minute medley was bold, and Mark swings comfortably through the numbers without a break, sounding relaxed throughout, ending with a clever restatement of all six". The recordings seemed to give his career a needed boost. "He was certainly gaining a higher profile on radio: in Billboard's 1959 poll of jazz disc jockeys he came in third behind Joe Williams and Frank Sinatra."

Will Friedwald said that the albums made during this period from 1956 to 1960 "reveal a young singer with a strong, dark, attractive voice, with a lot of good ideas and an obvious commitment to the jazz idiom-but one who stops just short of having a sound and a style of his own". Friedwald wrote, "As Murphy himself noted, the audience for these songs just wasn't his, and vice versa-even though he succeeded in doing something aesthetically interesting and indeed hip with material that no one would have thought could lend itself to such a treatment; this could be the start of something eclectic".

Ralph J Gleason, in Hi Fi Review, rated the performance as "mannered", and "affected" using "tricks and mannerisms of his idol" Frank Sinatra, which "hinders the effectiveness of his warm, personal sound".

DownBeat Magazine assigned the release 3 stars. The review says, "Mark Murphy is one of those singers whom instrumentalists are likely to like. He sings in tune with a shrewd sense of phrasing, executes interesting ideas, and otherwise comports himself in a musical manner . . . The trouble is, though, that instrumentalists are often not good judges of singers . . . Murphy has all the qualities to endear him to instrumentalists, few (at this point) of those that fascinate people who dig vocals - such as strong flavor of individuality, projection of verbal meaning and a feeling of believing in the words. Nonetheless, here is a young man who could become quite a singer, and Bill Holman has backed him well".

== Track listing ==
No.	Title	Lyrics	Music	Length
1.	"This Could Be the Start of Something"	Steve Allen	Allen	3:40
2.	"Day In – Day Out"	Johnny Mercer	Rube Bloom	3:55
3.	"The Lady Is A Tramp"	Lorenz Hart	Richard Rodgers	3:09
4.	"Mighty Like a Rose"	Traditional	Traditional	2:26
5.	"Falling in Love with Love"	Hart	Rodgers	2:39
6.	"Just in Time"	Adolph Green, Betty Comden	Jule Styne	2:59
7.	"Medley: That Old Black Magic / Cheek to Cheek / Jersey Bounce / Sweet Georgia Brown / Lucky in Love / Hit the Road to Dreamland / For Me and My Gal"	Mercer / Irving Berlin / Buddy Feyne / Ben Bernie, Kenneth Casey, Maceo Pinkard / B.G. DeSylva, Lew Brown / Mercer / E. Ray Goetz, Edgar Leslie	Harold Arlen / Berlin / Tiny Bradshaw, Eddie Johnson, Bobby Plater / Ben Bernie, Kenneth Casey, Maceo Pinkard / Ray Henderson / Arlen / George W. Meyer	16:41

== Personnel ==
Performance

On all tracks: Mark Murphy – vocals, original concept, Bill Holman – arranger, conductor

On tracks 1–6

- Pete Candoli, Conte Candoli – trumpet
- Bill Holman, Richie Kamuca – tenor saxophone
- Bobbie Gibbons – guitar
- Jimmy Rowles – piano
- Joe Mondragon – bass
- Mel Lewis – drums

On track 7

- Stu Williamson, Al Porcino, Lee Katzman – trumpet
- Dick Kenney – trombone
- Richie Kamuca – tenor saxophone
- Ronnie Lang – alto saxophone, flute
- Bobbie Gibbons – guitar
- Jimmy Rowles – piano
- Joe Mondragon – bass
- Mel Lewis – drums
- Charlie Mejia – percussion

Production

- Unknown – engineer, recorded at Capitol Studios, Vine Street, Los Angeles, December 1 (track 7) and 15 (all other tracks), 1958
- Tom Morgan – producer
- Bill Holman – liner notes
- Woody Woodward – re-issue design
- N. Boyle – illustration
