= Titans (Canadian TV series) =

- Directed by: Tom O'Neill
- Starring: Patrick Watson
- Country of origin: Canada
- Original language: English

Production
- Executive producer: Moses Znaimer
- Producer: Lisa Smith

Original release
- Release: 3 July 1981 – 22 August 1982

Related
- Witness to Yesterday

Titans is a Canadian docudrama series that was produced for the 1981/82 season by CBC and Citytv (Titans Television Limited). The shows premise revolves around staged interviews conducted by Patrick Watson with an actor who portrays a historical figure, conceptually similar to Watson's earlier series, Witness to Yesterday.

The program began as a summer series on CBC Television starting 3 July 1981. And its initial run ended on 25 September 1981. A second run of the series aired from 18 April to 22 August 1982.

== Guest actors ==
Following are some of the historical persons featured in the series, with the actors who portrayed them:

- Napoleon – David Calderisi
- Nefertiti – Marilyn Lightstone
- Galileo – Chris Wiggins
- Queen Elizabeth I – Frances Hyland
- Stephen Leacock – W. O. Mitchell
- Nostradamus – Len Birman
- Confucius – John Neville
- Albert Einstein – John Marley
- Billy Bishop – Cedric Smith
- George Sand – Andrea Martin
- Alexander Graham Bell – Patrick Watson

== See also ==
- Meeting of Minds – a similar interview series produced by Steve Allen
