= The Steve Allen Show =

1956 American variety television series

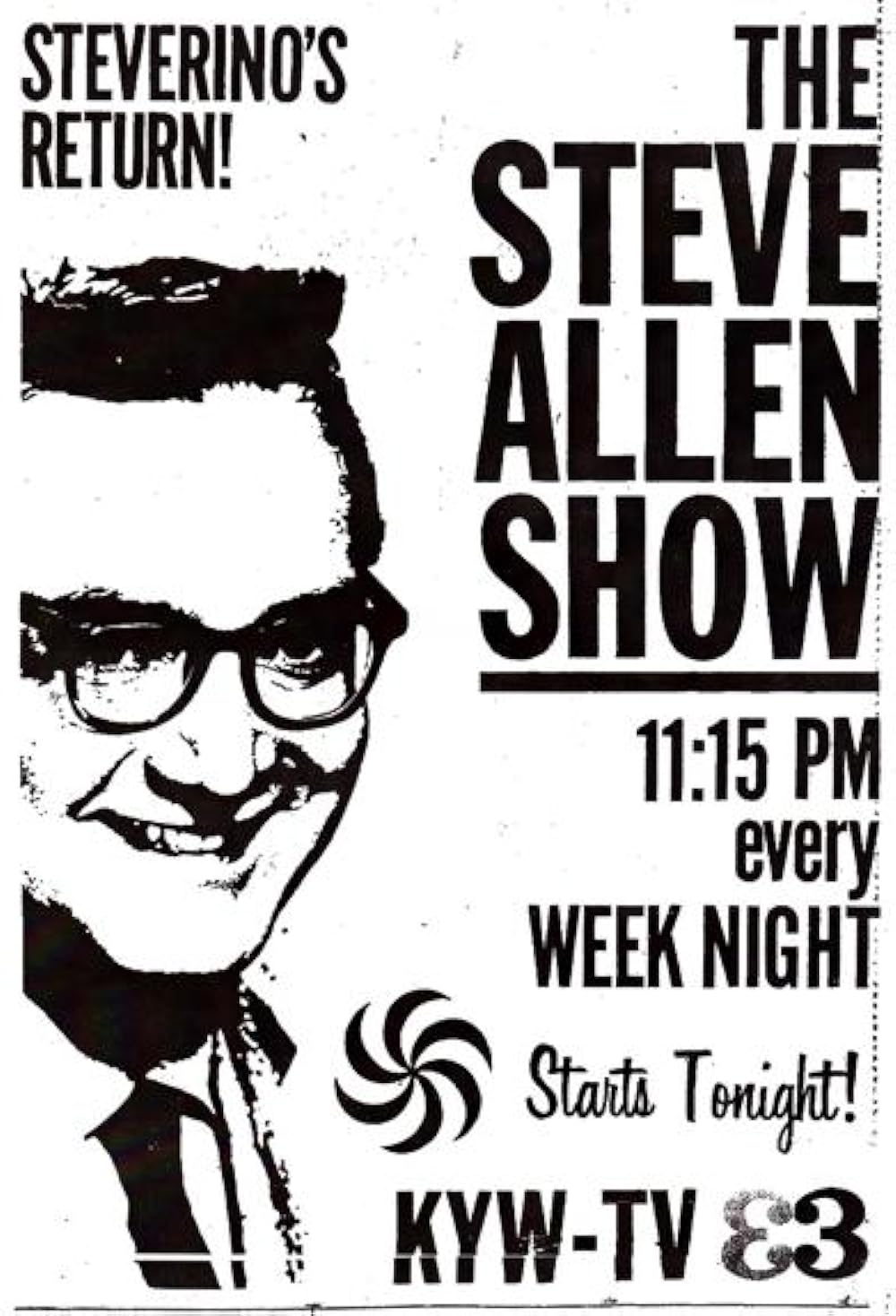
- Genre: Variety
- Starring: Steve Allen
- Announcer: Gene Rayburn (1956—1962, 1967); Johnny Jacobs (1962—1964, 1968—1971); Bill Daily (1964)
- Music by: Skitch Henderson (1956—1959); Les Brown and His Band of Renown (1959—1961); Donn Trenner (1962—1964); Terry Gibbs (1968—1971)
- Opening theme: "This Could Be the Start of Something"
- Country of origin: United States
- Original language: English

Production
- Production locations: New York City (1956—1959); Los Angeles (1959—1971)
- Camera setup: Multi-camera
- Running time: 60 minutes
- Production companies: Bellmeadow Enterprises (1956–1961); Westinghouse Broadcasting (1962–1964); Filmways (1968–1969); Golden West Broadcasters (1970–1971)

Original release
- Network: NBC
- Release: June 24, 1956 – 1960
- Network: ABC
- Release: September 1961 – December 1961
- Network: Syndication
- Release: June 11, 1962 – October 2, 1964
- Network: Syndication
- Release: March 5, 1968 – November 6, 1969
- Network: KTLA / Syndication
- Release: September 29, 1970 – October 21, 1971

Related
- Tonight Starring Steve Allen

The Steve Allen Show is an American variety show hosted by Steve Allen. It aired on NBC from June 24, 1956, to June 1960, returned on ABC from September to December 1961, and was revived as a first-run syndicated program distributed by Westinghouse Broadcasting from 1962 to 1964.

The NBC series began on Sunday nights at 8:00 p.m. Eastern Time, opposite The Ed Sullivan Show. It remained on Sundays through the 1958–59 season and moved to Mondays at 10:00 p.m. for the 1959–60 season. During its final NBC season it was titled The Steve Allen Plymouth Show, reflecting its sponsorship by Plymouth. After a season's absence, the series returned on ABC on Wednesdays at 7:30 p.m. from September through December 1961.

The syndicated version was generally carried in late-night time periods. It was a 90-minute weekday program produced by Westinghouse Broadcasting and offered to stations in first-run syndication.

Kinescopes of the NBC series were later edited into 104 half-hour programs and shown on Ha! and Comedy Central in the early 1990s, with newly recorded introductions by Allen.

== Overview ==
The program was a prime-time offshoot of Allen's work as the original host of NBC's Tonight. Its regular performers included Louis Nye, Tom Poston, Don Knotts, Pat Harrington Jr., Bill Dana, Dayton Allen and Gabe Dell. Gene Rayburn served as announcer during most of the NBC run, while Skitch Henderson was the bandleader.

Among the show's best-known recurring features was the "Man on the Street" sketch. Knotts appeared as the nervous Mr. Morrison, Poston as a man unable to remember his own name, Harrington as Italian golfer Guido Panzini, Nye as the self-satisfied Gordon Hathaway, and Dana as José Jiménez. Nye's greeting "Hi Ho, Steverino!" became associated with the program. Dayton Allen appeared in sketches using the catchphrase "Whyyyyy not?"

The show featured numerous musical performers, including Fats Domino, Louis Armstrong, Duke Ellington, Tony Bennett and Elvis Presley.

Allen was skeptical of rock and roll. On July 1, 1956, Presley appeared on the program to perform "Hound Dog". Allen had him perform in white tie and tails to a basset hound wearing a top hat. The presentation was devised in response to controversy over Presley's television performances and concerns about his performance style. The broadcast attracted an estimated audience of 40 million viewers.

After NBC ended the program in 1960, Allen returned to network prime time on ABC in September 1961 with The New Steve Allen Show. Nye, Poston, Harrington, Dell and Dayton Allen returned, while Joey Forman, Buck Henry, Tim Conway, The Smothers Brothers and Allen's wife, Jayne Meadows, joined the cast. The ABC version ended in December 1961.

In 1967, Allen reunited with several former regulars for the CBS summer series The Steve Allen Comedy Hour. It premiered on June 14 and ran through August 23, with Meadows, Nye, Dayton Allen, John Byner and Ruth Buzzi among the performers. The series marked early television appearances by Rob Reiner and Richard Dreyfuss.

== Syndication ==
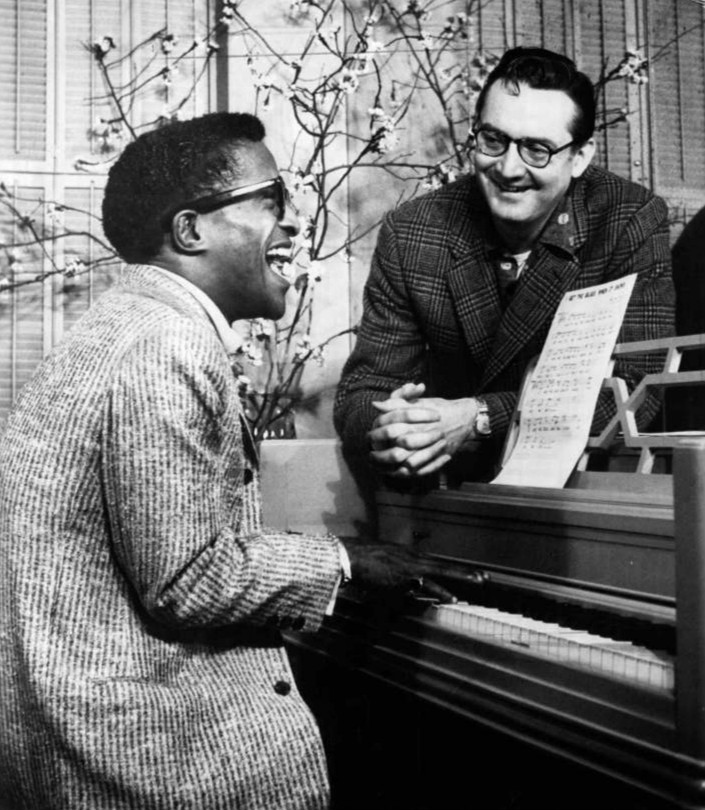
Allen and Sammy Davis Jr. rehearsing for the premiere show in 1956.

Westinghouse Broadcasting launched a weekday syndicated version of The Steve Allen Show in 1962. The 90-minute program was produced at Los Angeles's Filmarte Theatre, which Westinghouse renamed the Steve Allen Playhouse. By August 1962, the program had been sold in 22 markets.

Johnny Jacobs served as announcer and Donn Trenner led the orchestra. The orchestra included guitarist Herb Ellis and trombonist Frank Rosolino. Bill Daily later succeeded Jacobs as announcer.

The Westinghouse series retained the improvisational comedy and stunts Allen had developed on Tonight, including segments filmed outside the theater. Guests included Lenny Bruce, Peter Sellers, Miles Davis, Julius Sumner Miller, The Beach Boys and Frank Zappa. Jackie Vernon made his first television appearance on the program.

Westinghouse declined to distribute one episode featuring Bruce while he was facing obscenity prosecutions. Footage from the program was eventually shown in a 1998 HBO documentary. A 1964 episode featured actors portraying historical figures in a round-table discussion and served as an early version of the concept Allen later developed into Meeting of Minds.

Allen left the Westinghouse program in 1964 and Regis Philbin briefly succeeded him as host. Westinghouse subsequently launched Philbin's own syndicated late-night program. The final Westinghouse edition aired on October 2, 1964.

Allen returned to syndicated weekday television in 1968 with another Steve Allen Show, distributed by Filmways. The series ran from March 5, 1968, to November 6, 1969. It included appearances by Albert Brooks, including his ventriloquist routine "Danny and Dave". Steve Martin also appeared on the series.

On September 29, 1970, Allen began another version of The Steve Allen Show, produced for KTLA in Los Angeles and distributed by Golden West Broadcasters. The series ran until October 21, 1971.

== Legacy ==
Allen's approach to television comedy influenced later generations of late-night hosts. David Letterman cited Allen as a major influence and incorporated variations of several of Allen's television stunts into Late Night and the Late Show. Allen himself noted the similarities and said that Letterman regularly acknowledged their origin. Johnny Carson also credited Allen with establishing elements of the late-night television format.

The syndicated Westinghouse series was noted for improvisational comedy and elaborate stunts, some of which extended outside the studio. These included segments staged around the nearby Hollywood Ranch Market and other locations in the neighborhood. The program also provided early television exposure to performers and musicians who later became prominent. Jackie Vernon made his television debut on the show. In 1963, a 22-year-old Frank Zappa appeared as a "musical bicyclist", producing sounds from bicycles with drumsticks, a bass bow and other techniques. Health-food advocate Gypsy Boots also became a recurring guest during the early 1960s.

Allen also used the program to develop the concept that later became Meeting of Minds. He had conceived the idea of presenting actors portraying historical figures in a talk-show format during the NBC years, but plans to use it on the program were abandoned after objections from its sponsor. Allen later presented versions of the format before it was developed into the PBS series Meeting of Minds, which premiered in 1977.

Allen returned to syndicated television in 1968 with another Steve Allen Show, distributed by Filmways. The series continued the combination of interviews, sketches and unconventional stunts associated with his earlier programs. Albert Brooks appeared on the program in 1968 performing his ventriloquist parody "Danny and Dave"; the appearance was followed by further national television work on The Dean Martin Show, The Ed Sullivan Show, The Merv Griffin Show and The Tonight Show Starring Johnny Carson. Steve Martin also appeared on Allen's syndicated program early in his performing career.

== Awards ==
The Steve Allen Show received a Peabody Award in 1958 for television entertainment with humor.
