= Patrick Watson (producer) =

Canadian broadcaster and interviewer (1929–2022)

Patrick Watson CC
- Watson in 1988
- Born: December 23, 1929; Toronto, Ontario, Canada
- Died: July 4, 2022 (aged 92); Ontario, Canada
- Education: University of Toronto; University of Michigan
- Occupations: Broadcaster; writer; producer; director; interviewer; author; host
- Notable work: Countdown to Looking Glass This Hour Has Seven Days The Terry Fox Story
- Honours: Order of Canada

Patrick Watson CC (December 23, 1929 – July 4, 2022) was a Canadian broadcaster, television and radio interviewer and host, author, commentator, actor, television writer, producer, and director for five decades, serving as Chairman of the Canadian Broadcasting Corporation from 1989 to 1994. A native of Ontario, Watson began his career on radio in the 1940s and became one of the hosts of his best-known work, This Hour Has Seven Days, as well as his own show, the Watson Report which he hosted from 1975 to 1981.

Outside of journalism, he also had a career in film, his most notable roles being in Bethune (1977), a cameo in The Terry Fox Story (1983), playing an evening news host in the HBO Cold War-era movie Countdown to Looking Glass (1984) alongside American reporter Eric Sevareid, considered his most iconic appearance on screen. He also had roles in The Fourth Angel (2001) and Slings and Arrows (2003).

A longtime disability advocate after having a leg amputated in 1960, he was also honorary chair of the Canadian Amputee Sports Association and chairman emeritus of the Canadian Abilities Foundation. Considered an icon of Canadian journalism, Watson was appointed an Officer of the Order of Canada in 1981 and later Companion in 2002 for his outstanding services to public broadcasting.

== Early life ==
Born on December 23, 1929, in Toronto, Watson attended the University of Toronto and graduated with an MA. He began working on his doctorate at the University of Michigan, but withdrew in 1955 to focus on working for CBC Television.

== Career ==
Watson's first broadcast, in 1943, was as a radio actor in the CBC's children's dramatic series The Kootenay Kid. He first achieved national fame (and in some quarters, notoriety) as the co-producer and, with Laurier LaPierre, on-camera co-host of the CBC Television current affairs program This Hour Has Seven Days in the mid-1960s. Watson went on to write, edit, and/or produce The Undersea World of Jacques Cousteau, Witness to Yesterday, and Titans. He travelled to the United States for a short stint as an anchor and principal interviewer of The 51st State, a local news program televised in 1972–1973 on WNET in New York City. Watson also hosted the CBC's business program Venture when it was first launched in 1985.

In 1983 he created and performed, solo, a stage version of the Old Testament's The Book of Job, at first at the Nathan Cohen Studio in Toronto, directed by John McGreevey, and then at the National Arts Centre Theatre in Ottawa. For CBC he hosted and/or produced shows such as The Watson Report, The Canadian Establishment and The World Challenge. He also created the Heritage Minutes, The Canadians: Biographies of a Nation, and The Struggle for Democracy series; the last has since aired in over 40 countries around the world. It took five years to make, was filmed in 30 countries and was, at the time, the most expensive original documentary series ever made for Canadian television. The Heritage Minutes were an initiative of Watson's begun in 1988 at Charles Bronfman's CRB Foundation (now The Historica Dominion Institute).

Watson was chairman of the CBC from 1989 until 1994. He was the recipient of honorary Doctor of Laws degrees from Mount Allison University in 2002 and the University of Toronto in 2004. He was invested as an Officer of the Order of Canada in 1981, then promoted to Companion in 2002. Watson continued to write, lecture, advise, and work in many capacities in broadcasting. He was married to Caroline Furey Bamford. Watson has acted in more than 50 dramatic productions, including the movie The Terry Fox Story, and the HBO movie Countdown to Looking Glass.

== Personal life ==
His left leg was amputated above the knee in 1960 due to injuries sustained when he fell from a ladder. He often assisted the Canadian disabled community, including serving as honorary chair of the Canadian Amputee Sports Association and chairman emeritus of the Canadian Abilities Foundation. He also had a small cameo role in the 1983 film The Terry Fox Story as an amputee farmer who breaks away from a crowd of spectators to run a short distance alongside Terry Fox.

Watson was married to Caroline Bamford, and had two sons and a daughter. He died at his home in Ontario on July 4, 2022.

== Selected bibliography ==
- Conspirators In Silence. Toronto, Montreal: McClelland and Stewart. 1969. OCLC 504688802.
- Fasanella's city : the paintings of Ralph Fasanella with the story of his life and art. New York: Knopf. 1973. ISBN 0-39448823-7.
- Zero To Airtime: a novel. Toronto: Fitzhenry and Whiteside. 1974. ISBN 0-88902015-9.
- Dolgun, Alexander; Watson, Patrick (1975). Alexander Dolgun's story : an American in the Gulag. New York: Knopf. ISBN 0-39449497-0.
- Alter Ego: a novel. Toronto: Lester & Orpen. 1978. ISBN 0-91963005-7.
- Watson, Patrick; Barber, Benjamin (1988). The Struggle for Democracy (Revised ed.). Toronto: Lester & Orpen Dennys. ISBN 0-88619176-9.
- Ahmek. Illustrated by Tracy Thomson. North York: Stoddart Kids. 1999. ISBN 0-77373145-8.
- Watson, Patrick; Fraser, Hugh (2000). The Canadians : biographies of a nation. Toronto: McArthur. ISBN 1-55278170-4.
- This Hour Has Seven Decades. Toronto: McArthur. 2004. ISBN 1-55278440-1.
- Wittgenstein and the Goshawk: a fable. Toronto: McArthur. 2004. ISBN 1-55278449-5.
- Finn's Thin Book of Irish Ironies. Illustrated by Aislin and Mary Hughson. Toronto: McArthur. 2010. ISBN 978-1-55278847-9.
- Limericks. Toronto: McArthur. 2011. ISBN 978-1-55278946-9.
