= Meeting of Minds =

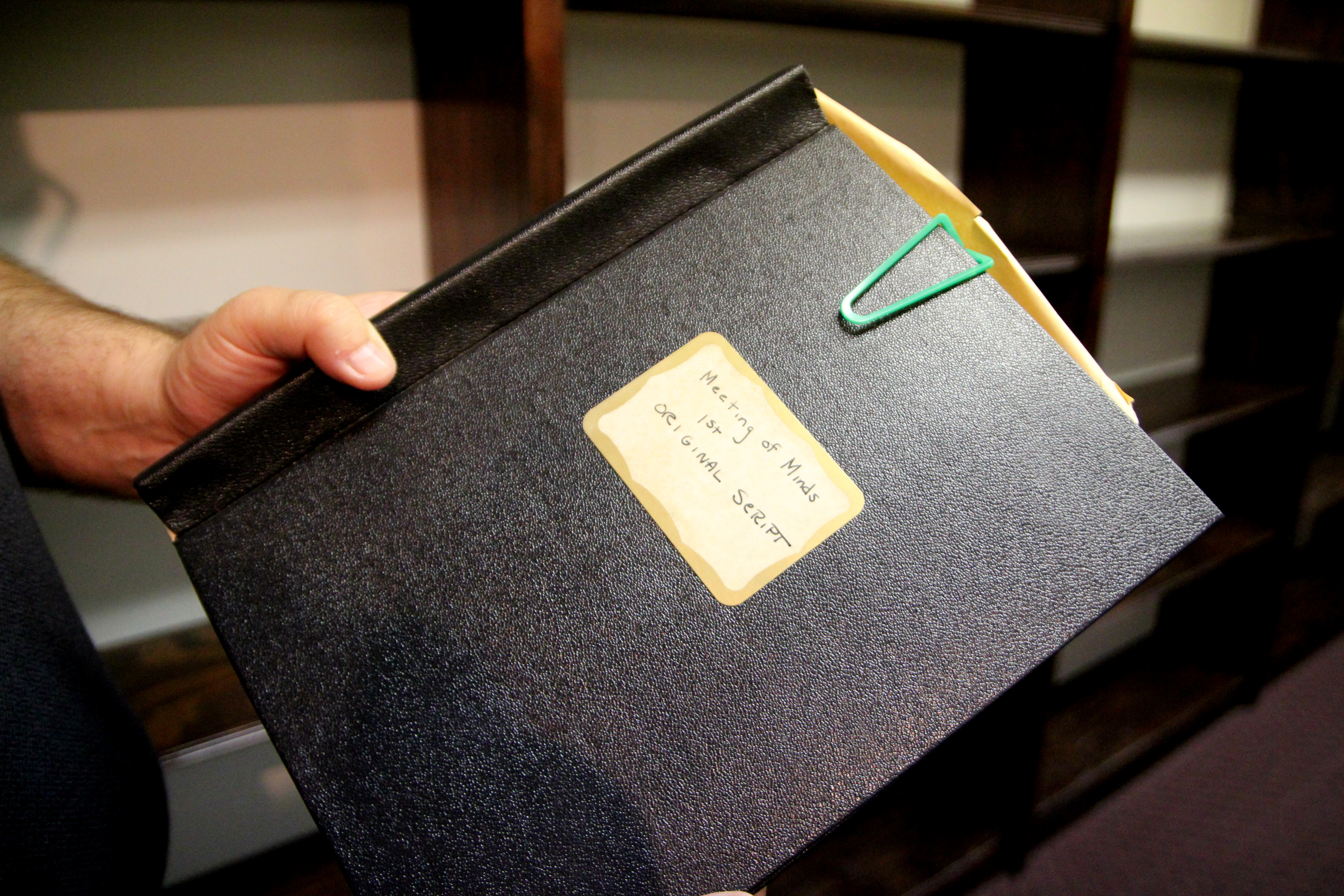
- Cover of Meeting of Minds script from collection held at Center for Inquiry, Amherst, New York
- Created by: Steve Allen
- Country of origin: United States
- No. of seasons: 4
- No. of episodes: 24

Original release
- Network: PBS
- Release: January 10, 1977 – May 3, 1981

Meeting of Minds is a television series, created by Steve Allen, which aired on PBS from 1977 to 1981.

The show featured actors playing historical figures, but in a talk show format. Guests would interact with each other and host Steve Allen, discussing philosophy, religion, history, science, and many other topics.

== Origin ==
Steve Allen originally created the concept for Meeting of Minds in the late 1950s. He intended to broadcast it as a segment of his weekly The Steve Allen Show television program but the show's sponsor, The Chrysler Corporation, raised objections and the segment plans were cancelled. Five years later, however, Allen and an acting troupe finally performed the segment on Allen's nightly Westinghouse show. Then, in 1971, Allen attempted to revive the concept as part of a syndicated talk series. The first episode was a critical success, and the program won three local Emmy awards. Allen then personally financed the development of six additional one-hour programs, which were ultimately produced by PBS beginning in 1977.

== PBS series 1977–1981 ==
The series was filmed at television station KCET in Hollywood, California. As nearly as was possible, the actual words of the historical figures were used. The show was fully scripted, yet the scripts were carefully crafted to give the appearance of spontaneous discussion among historic figures. Guests included: Plato, Socrates, Aristotle, Thomas Aquinas, Martin Luther, Cleopatra, Marie Antoinette, Florence Nightingale, Thomas Paine, Francis Bacon, Thomas Jefferson, Voltaire, Karl Marx, Charles Darwin, Daniel O'Connell, Catherine II, and Oliver Cromwell.

Typically, each episode would be split into two parts, broadcast separately, with most or all of the guests introduced over the course of the first part, and the discussions continuing into the second part. A total of 24 episodes (or 12 two-part episodes) were produced.

Actors made multiple appearances as different guests over the course of the series; this was particularly true of Allen's wife, Jayne Meadows, who appeared in 18 of the 24 episodes (playing nine distinct characters). There was also one major departure from the usual format, in which William Shakespeare was joined by several characters from his plays, with Meadows playing the role of the "dark lady" of his sonnets.

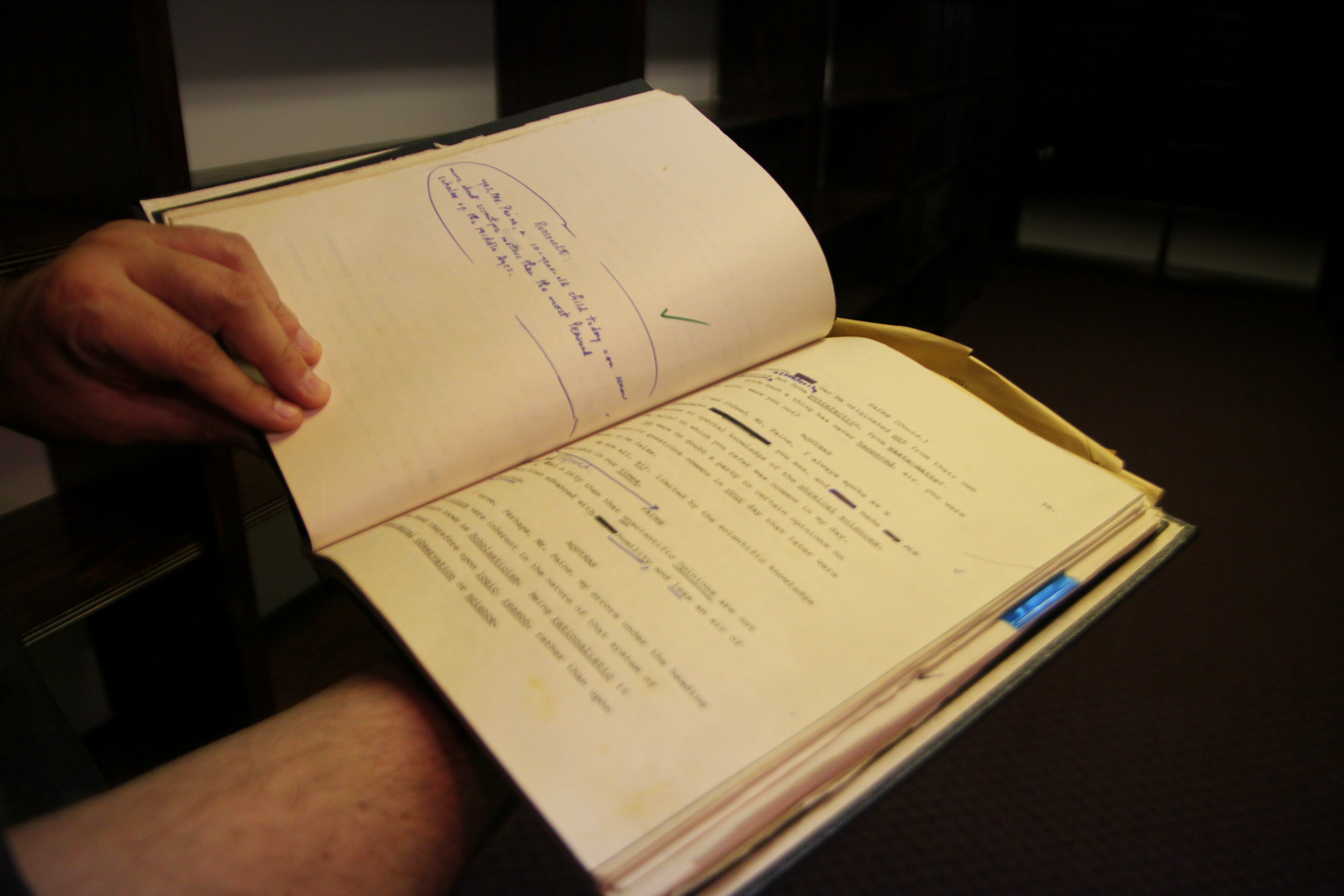
Meeting of Minds script with notations by Steve Allen. Collection held at Center for Inquiry, Amherst, New York

The show won many awards, including an Emmy Award. Meeting of Minds nominations:

- Outstanding Writing in a Drama Series – 1978: Steve Allen, Writer;
- Outstanding Performance by a Supporting Actress in a comedy or drama series – 1978: Beulah Quo;
- Outstanding Lead Actress for a Single Performance in a drama or comedy series – 1978: Jayne Meadows;
- Outstanding Achievement in Video Tape Editing for a Series – 1977: Terry Pickford, Editor and a Peabody Award.

The scripts are available for public performance. Because of their educational nature, Allen did not attach a royalty to such performances.

== Similar series ==
The Canadian television series Witness to Yesterday, created by Arthur Voronka, aired three years before Allen's Emmy-award-winning local program. Unlike the Meeting of Minds round table format, Witness to Yesterday employed a one-on-one interview format that focused on a single historical figure each episode. Steve Allen appeared on a 1976 episode of Witness to Yesterday as George Gershwin.

Another Canadian TV series, Titans, followed a similar format. It was originally broadcast in 1981–82.

In French-speaking Canada, a version titled Les grands esprits ("The Great Minds") aired on Radio-Canada from 1982 to 1989. It was based on the original concept, with the scripts adapted and translated for the viewers by Jean Boisvert.
