= Witness to Yesterday =

Canadian television series

- Genre: Docudrama
- Created by: Arthur Voronka
- Written by: Arthur Voronka
- Presented by: Patrick Watson
- Country of origin: Canada
- Original language: English
- No. of seasons: 2
- No. of episodes: 33

Production
- Producers: Tom Moore; Arthur Voronka
- Production location: Montreal
- Production company: Look Hear Productions

Original release
- Network: Global; CICA/TVOntario
- Release: 8 January 1974 – 1976

Related
- Titans (1981–1982)

Witness to Yesterday is a Canadian docudrama television series which featured staged interviews with historical personalities. It was first broadcast by Global Television Network in 1974 then produced by TVOntario to 1976. A 12-episode revival of the series was produced in 1998 for History Television.

== Synopsis ==
Each episode featured a historical person as portrayed by a guest actor in conversation with host Patrick Watson who took the role of an interviewer.

Witness to Yesterday was among the first series to be broadcast by Global. Original episodes were broadcast on Global in a regular Tuesday 10:00 p.m. time slot from 8 January 1974 to 21 May 1974. The debut episode featured Sandy Dennis as Joan of Arc.

== Production ==
The series was produced in Montreal by Look Hear Productions, a division of the McConnell advertising company.

Laurier Lapierre conducted research for the series. Scripts were written, but the filming often incorporated ad-lib dialogue. Each episode was produced for approximately $6000 with actors paid from $600 to $2500. Host Patrick Watson earned 15% of the international sales income plus his base $500 per episode. Writers included Patrick Watson, Patrick Withrow and Doug Scott.

Global Television Network encountered financial difficulties in its initial months and cancelled most of its original Canadian programming by May 1974. Global owed Look Hear Productions $130,000 for producing 24 episodes of Witness to Yesterday. The last episode filmed prior to Global's cancellation featured Donald Sutherland as doctor Norman Bethune. Global eventually paid 30% of its bill for the series as part of its financial settlement with creditors.

CBC Television considered picking up the series but by then had booked other productions. Witness to Yesterday was transferred to Toronto educational station CICA-TV (OECA) which planned the production of three new episodes for the 1974–75 season and another 13 for the 1975–76 season, in addition to rebroadcasting the initial 20 episodes.

== Episodes ==
=== Global Television Network episodes (1974) ===
Global broadcast the series on a regular 10 p.m. Tuesday time slot.

No.	Title / Historical figure	Starring	Original release date	Notes / Refs
1	"Joan of Arc"	Sandy Dennis	8 January 1974	Pilot episode
2	"Sitting Bull"	August Schellenberg	15 January 1974	
3	"Queen Victoria"	Kate Reid	22 January 1974	
4	"René-Robert Cavelier, Sieur de La Salle"	Laurier LaPierre	29 January 1974	
5	"Catherine the Great"	Zoe Caldwell	5 February 1974	
6	"Patrick J. Whelan"	Patrick McFadden	12 February 1974	
7	"Sarah Bernhardt"	Denise Pelletier	19 February 1974	
8	"Billy the Kid"	Richard Dreyfuss	26 February 1974	
9	"John A. Macdonald"	Robert Christie	5 March 1974	
10	"Nell Gwyn"	Dawn Greenhalgh	12 March 1974	
11	"Christopher Columbus"	William Hutt	19 March 1974	
12	"William Shakespeare"	Barry Morse	26 March 1974	
13	"Thomas Paine"	Robert Vaughn	2 April 1974	
14	"Walter Raleigh"	Chris Wiggins	9 April 1974	written by Doug Scott
15	"Socrates"	Mavor Moore	16 April 1974	
16	"Judas Iscariot"	Donald Davis	23 April 1974	
17	"Mata Hari"	Maruska Stankova	30 April 1974	
18	"Duke of Wellington"	Christopher Plummer	7 May 1974	
19	"Leonardo da Vinci"	Patrick Watson	14 May 1974	
20	"Rembrandt"	Robert Markle	21 May 1974	

=== CICA/TVOntario episodes (1974–1976) ===
Historical figure	Starring
"Al Capone"	Henry Ramer
"George Gershwin"	Steve Allen
"Akhenaten"	Allan Migicovsky
"Mohandas Gandhi"	Louis Negin
"Earl of Durham"	Colin Fox
"Emma Goldman"	Marilyn Lightstone
"Lucrezia Borgia"	Alexandra Bastedo
"Adolf Hitler"	Robin Gammell
"Catherine de' Medici"	Sydney Sturgess
"Norman Bethune"	Donald Sutherland
"Mark Twain"	Alex Trebek
"George Bernard Shaw"	Barry Morse
"Grigori Rasputin"	August Schellenberg
"Mary Todd Lincoln"	Marian Waldman
"Cleopatra"	Jayne Meadows

== Reception ==
Witness to Yesterday was sold to broadcasters in Australia, New Zealand, the United Kingdom and on other Canadian stations.

Blaik Kirby of The Globe and Mail deemed the premiere to be "flat and undramatic", noting that French-Canadian actress Geneviève Bujold should have been considered for the role of Joan of Arc over the less appropriate performance from American Sandy Dennis. Later, Kirby gave the overall series a favourable review, noting that it "was in almost everyone's opinion, one of the very best of Global's Canadian programs, which were a worthy achievement even as a group."

== 1998 revival ==
Witness to Yesterday
- Directed by: Alan Gough; Patrick Watson
- Presented by: Patrick Watson
- No. of seasons: 1
- No. of episodes: 12

Production
- Production locations: Fredericton; Toronto
- Running time: 30 minutes
- Production companies: XX**

Original release
- Network: History
- Release: 24 March – 16 June 1998

New episodes of Witness to Yesterday were broadcast by History Television in 1998. Watson again hosted the series and was its primary writer with additional writing by Hugh Graham. 12 episodes were completed of a 13-episode plan under a $700,000 budget. Eight episodes were recorded in December 1997 at St. Thomas University in Fredericton. The remaining episodes were recorded in Toronto. Alan Gough directed this series revival with Watson. New Brunswick company Cinefile and Toronto's The Film Works co-produced the series revival. Victor Solnicki and Barry Cameron were executive producers from Cinefile and The Film Works respectively. Its budget was supported by History Television, PBS which aired these episodes and a $168,500 credit from provincial agency Film NB.

=== History Television episodes (1998) ===
No.	Title / Historical figure	Starring	Original release date	Notes / Refs
1	"Marie Antoinette"	Cynthia Dale	24 March 1998	
2	"Niccolò Machiavelli"	David Calderisi	31 March 1998	TBA
3	"Marie Curie"	TBA	7 April 1998	TBA
4	"Genghis Khan"	Gordon Tootoosis	14 April 1998	
5	"Amelia Earhart"	Martha Burns	21 April 1998	
6	"Tecumseh"	Raoul Trujillo	28 April 1998	
7	"Mary Pickford"	Charmion King	5 May 1998	
8	"Mary Ann Shadd"	Sylvia Sweeney	19 May 1998	
9	"Vladimir Lenin"	Michael Ironside	26 May 1998	
10	"William Stephenson"	John Neville	2 June 1998	
11	"Alexander the Great"	Paul Gross	9 June 1998	
12	"Sigmund Freud"	TBA	16 June 1998	TBA

== See also ==
- Titans (Canadian TV series), a similar series (1981–1982) in which Watson also starred
- Meeting of Minds, a similar series created by Steve Allen in the late 1950s, aired locally to critical acclaim in 1971 and nationally on PBS from 1977 to 1981. Allen appeared on a 1976 episode of Witness to Yesterday as George Gershwin.
