= Countdown to Looking Glass =

- Genre: Drama; Docufiction
- Written by: Albert Ruben
- Directed by: Fred Barzyk
- Starring: Scott Glenn; Michael Murphy; Helen Shaver; Patrick Watson
- Country of origin: Canada
- Original language: English

Production
- Executive producer: Fred Barzyk
- Producer: David R. Loxton
- Cinematography: Miklós Lente
- Editors: Bernie Clayton; Peter C. Frank; Leah Siegel
- Running time: 86 minutes
- Production company: HBO

Original release
- Network: HBO
- Release: October 14, 1984

Countdown to Looking Glass is a Canadian made-for-television movie that premiered in the United States on HBO on October 14, 1984 and was also broadcast on CTV in Canada. The movie presents a fictional confrontation between the United States and the Soviet Union over the Strait of Hormuz, the gateway to the Persian Gulf. The narrative of the film details the events that lead up to the initial exchange of nuclear weapons, which was triggered by a banking crisis, from the perspective of an ongoing news broadcast.

Unlike similar productions such as the previous year's Special Bulletin and the later Without Warning, the producers of this film decided not to make the entire production a simulated newscast, but instead break up the news portions with dramatic narrative scenes involving characters played by Scott Glenn, Helen Shaver and Michael Murphy. The appearance of real-life newscasters, as well as noted CBC Television host Patrick Watson (although he does not appear as himself in this film) lent additional authenticity to the production.

== Plot ==
The CVN news network's nightly program, starring Don Tobin (Patrick Watson), with reports from correspondents Michael Boyle (Scott Glenn) and Dorian Waldorf (Helen Shaver), discusses a terrorist bombing of the American embassy in Saudi Arabia that killed an American ambassador. The week before, a global banking crisis, caused by several South American countries defaulting on their loans, led to turmoil in Southwest Asia. Before the unrest spread to Saudi Arabia, Soviet-backed militants led a coup in Oman when the Omani economy collapsed. Shortly after, a new report shows the banking crisis may soon begin to ease.

During this time, Waldorf's Pentagon insider boyfriend is providing off-the-record insight into the White House's response to all these events, and suggests that there may be too many critical events going on at once for the President and his advisers to handle effectively.

On day two, it is revealed that a large military operation was launched to keep the peace in Saudi Arabia, with many American soldiers, ships, and planes being sent at King Fahd's request. This move is heavily criticized, both in the US and abroad. The United Kingdom, America's closest ally, refuses to take part in the operation as do many other of America's allies. However, the attitude of the American representatives is clear that they can perform the peacekeeping mission alone, citing the success of the British in the past in containing the Soviets' previous provocation in the area.

On day four, in response to America's move into Saudi Arabia, which the Soviet Union sees as provocative, the Soviet-backed puppet government in Oman imposes a $10,000 toll for every oil tanker passing through the Strait of Hormuz into the Persian Gulf. The Soviet government claims it will remove the toll if the Americans withdraw troops from Saudi Arabia. The captains of the tankers refuse to pay the toll, effectively creating an economic blockade in which no oil can be transported through the Persian Gulf.

A breaking news alert on the fifth day of the Middle East crisis reveals that a short battle took place between American warplanes and unidentified enemy warplanes, presumed to be from Iran or Kuwait, in which an American AWACS plane was shot down over the Persian Gulf before two of the five attacking planes were shot down. The attacking aircraft were presumably aiming for an oil refinery in Ras Tanura in retaliation for Saudi Arabia's request for American troops.

Meanwhile, Waldorf brings a story to CVN: her boyfriend had provided her with satellite photos that suggests that Soviet forces have disappeared from their border with Iran, possibly as a covert invitation to mutually withdraw from the area — an invitation that could have been ignored in the flood of information the multiple global crises have created ("The signal-to-noise ratio in there [The White House] is horrendous."). However, Tobin reluctantly insists that Waldorf have more than one source for the story.

On day six of the crisis, an American aircraft carrier, the USS Nimitz and its battle group, armed with both nuclear and conventional weapons, are sent by the U.S. President to the Persian Gulf to ensure the free passage of oil tankers in the region; the President also activates Selective Service, drafting thousands of soldiers in anticipation of a larger conflict. The Soviet Union quickly responds to this action by sending submarines to the Persian Gulf. CVN sends Michael Boyle to the Nimitz to cover the deployment. The Soviets publicly criticize the United States for failing to accept their offers of conciliation and mutual withdrawal from the area, implying that Waldorf's information was correct and that the US may have given up an opportunity for a peaceful solution.

On day eight of the crisis, in response to the growing urgency of the situation, CVN begins to broadcast 24 hours a day. In addition, the US begins shutting down its nuclear power plants nationwide. Shortly after a State Department briefing, the Defense Secretary dies, perhaps of a heart attack brought on by the stresses of crisis management.

On day nine, the crisis deepens when an Omani gunboat attacks and apparently destroys an unarmed Dutch vessel which tried to pass through the Strait of Hormuz. The CVN broadcast also notes the presence of Soviet attack submarines near the site of the attack. At this point, people begin to evacuate cities, overseas air travel is suspended by the FAA and Civil Aeronautics Board, many American schools begin closing, the Strategic Air Command redeploys B-52 bombers throughout the nation's airports, an act noted not to have happened since the Cuban Missile Crisis, and people are urged to stay off their phones. By nightfall, an evacuation of the White House is ordered. Later, Waldorf is met by her boyfriend at the news studio, offering to take her along in the evacuation—the President has delegated tactical nuclear launch authority to the Nimitz battle group commander after the destruction of the Dutch vessel, and the chances of a nuclear exchange in the Gulf have increased significantly. Waldorf chooses to remain in Washington to continue her work.

A night battle then erupts between Omani gunboats and the U.S. Navy in the Strait of Hormuz, with an Omani gunboat firing on and disabling a warship before being destroyed by the other American vessels. Despite the gravity of the situation, Tobin discusses his optimistic viewpoint of the situation with correspondent Eric Sevareid, believing that "[r]easonable people, once they've looked the Devil in the face, aren't going to shake hands with him."

Shortly after the Omani gunboat exchanges fire with the American ship, a Soviet submarine slips through the perimeter of American picket ships and is tracked on a course towards the Nimitz, which attempts to defend itself by deploying depth charges in an effort to sink the sub. When these fail to stop the submarine, a massive explosion erupts from the water, indicating that a nuclear depth bomb may have been used. Boyle evacuates into the carrier's island, confronting an officer to find out who provided authorization for the nuclear attack, but cannot get a clear answer. A nuclear weapon explodes inside the carrier group, causing an unknown level of damage, though the Nimitz stays afloat. As an injured Boyle remarks that a nuclear exchange must have taken place, the sound of another explosion is heard, and CVN loses contact with him.

At this point, the White House is completely evacuated, with the President, Joint Chiefs of Staff, and other White House officials evacuated onto the National Emergency Airborne Command Post plane with the Strategic Air Command's airborne command center Looking Glass in accompaniment, and the Emergency Broadcast System is activated.

In the moments before CVN's broadcast is transferred over to the Emergency Broadcast System, Tobin reiterates his optimism, discussing the opinions of a deceased colleague who was considered an expert in nuclear war scenarios. His colleague held the belief that a nuclear exchange would someday take place, but when the two superpowers were confronted with the horror of the situation, they would choose peace over war. As the now-disillusioned Tobin prepares to turn things over to the EBS, it is obvious that he is shaken by the events that have occurred, and is almost mournfully afraid of the inescapable realization that there may be no future at all for humankind.

The film ends with the takeoff of an aircraft from Andrews Air Force Base, presumably the President’s airborne command post, or Looking Glass, as the CVN broadcast is cut off, replaced by an Emergency Action Notification message.

== Cast ==
- Scott Glenn as Michael Boyle
- Michael Murphy as Bob Calhoun
- Helen Shaver as Dorian Waldorf
- Patrick Watson as Don Tobin
- Nancy Dickerson as Herself
- Eric Sevareid as Himself
- Matsu Anderson as Matsu Yamada
- Lincoln P. Bloomfield as Himself
- Newt Gingrich as Himself
- Eugene McCarthy as Himself
- Paul Warnke as Himself
- Robert Ellsworth as Himself
- Gene La Rocque as Himself
