= David Calderisi =

Canadian actor (born 1940)

- Born: David Aloysius Calderisi; 21 June 1940 (age 86); Montreal, Quebec, Canada
- Education: McGill University; London Academy of Music and Dramatic Art
- Occupations: Actor, teacher, theatre director
- Spouse: Marsha Abramson (m. 1985)

David Calderisi (born 21 June 1940) is a Canadian actor with a career in both Canada and the United Kingdom.

== Early life ==
Calderisi was born in Montreal and began performing as an actor at the age of eight in Our Lady of Fatima with the St. Genesius Players while as an altar boy at St. Aloysius Church. After appearing on and off with the group until age 12, he put any thoughts of a theatrical career aside. However, Calderisi was drawn back to acting in 1956 while studying engineering at McGill University after meeting a girl who was appearing in a production of My Fur Lady at the faculty. Joining the revue for its cross-Canada tour until it closed in Vancouver, Calderisi realised he wanted to be in theatre. In order to become a professional actor, he decided to get professional training.

== Career ==
After training as an actor in London from 1959 to 1962, Calderisi made appearances in iconic British TV shows including The Saint, The Count of Monte Cristo, The Baron, Doctor Who (serial: The Mind of Evil) and The Protectors.

At the same time, he collaborated with David Halliwell to revolutionize British theatre by bringing lunchtime performances to the masses. They formed the company Quipu, which from 1966 to 1976 operated at various venues including the London Academy of Music and Dramatic Art (LAMDA, where Calderisi studied for the stage). Calderisi has also acted and directed in theatres across the West End in productions such as The Experiment and The Theatre of Death written by Philip Martin. He was invited back to Montreal in 1967 to direct The Lower Depths, staged by students of the National Theatre School, staying for 10 weeks.

Returning properly to Canada in 1971, Calderisi had appearances in The Littlest Hobo, War of the Worlds, Due South, Kung Fu: The Legend Continues and Hannibal amongst others, as well as the recurring role of Barry Calvert in Earth: Final Conflict. Theatre work includes playing Frankenstein's monster on stage in Montreal as well as a one-man show performance of Rubaiyat of Omar Khayyam, translated by poet Edward FitzGerald.

As a teacher, Calderisi has taught and directed at Centre for Indigenous Theatre, National Theatre School of Canada and York University as well as colleges George Brown, Humber and Sheridan.

== Filmography ==
=== Film ===
Year	Title	Role	Notes
1978	Power Play	Blair's Assistant	
1982	Highpoint	Prisoner in Jail	
1983	Skullduggery	Sorceror / Dr. Evel	
1984	Best Revenge	Best Revenge	
1989	Millennium	Leacock	
1989	Brown Bread Sandwiches	Father Perelli	
1995	Tommy Boy	'Yes' Executive	
1995	The Michelle Apartments	Mr. Turnbull	
1998	Shadow Builder	Bishop Gallo	
1998	Sanctuary	Bishop Gallo	
2005	The Dark Hours	Dr. Lew Lanigan	
2012	Havana 57	Moretti	
2019	Mafia Inc.	Gerlando Zecco	
2021	Astonishing Tales of Terror: Rocktapussy!	Churchill	

=== Television ===
Year	Title	Role	Notes
1961	Top Secret	Bobby	Episode: "After the Fair"
1962	Suspense	First Newsman	Episode: "Course for Collision"
1962	Captain Brassbound's Conversion	Hassan	Television film
1962	BBC Sunday-Night Play	Jim	Episode: "The Day Before Atlanta"
1962	The Day Before Atlanta	Nicholas Ortega	Episode #2.11
1962	The Saint	Vittorio	Episode: "The Latin Touch"
1963	ITV Play of the Week	Nicholas	Episode: "Velvet Cage"
1964	Hamlet at Elsinore	Rosencrantz	Television film
1964	Festival	Hotel clerk	Episode: "Justin Thyme"
1964	The Big Noise	Ted	2 episodes
1964	The Count of Monte Cristo	Jacopo Manfredi	4 episodes
1965	The Man in Room 17	Roberto	Episode: "Up Against a Brick Wall"
1966	The Baron	Hotel clerk	Episode: "Time to Kill"
1967	The Queen's Traitor	Ridolfi	4 episodes
1967	Mrs Thursday	Juan	Episode: "When in Malaga"
1971	Doctor Who	Charlie	Episode: "The Mind of Evil: Episode Four"
1972	The Protectors	Garage Mechanic	Episode: "Disappearing Trick"
1977	The New Avengers	Halfhide	Episode: "Foreward Base"
1979–1982	The Littlest Hobo	Various roles	3 episodes
1980	The Great Detective	Mr. Sherman	Episode: "A Watery Grave"
1980	King of Kensington	Dr. Bauer	Episode: "Counter Attack"
1981	Titans	Napoleon Bonaparte	Episode: "Napoleon"
1982–1985	Seeing Things	Various roles	3 episodes
1985	The Cuckoo Bird	Roddy	Television film
1985	Shellgame	Billy Sweet	Television film
1985–1988	Night Heat	Benoir	3 episodes
1986	Adderly	Ambassador Olin	Episode: "Nina Who?"
1988, 1990	T. and T.	Uncle Tiko / Finn	2 episodes
1988, 1993	Street Legal	Various roles	2 episodes
1989	War of the Worlds	Advocate #1	7 episodes
1993	Matrix	Sal	Episode: "Love Kills"
1994	Spenser: Pale Kings and Princes	Captain Henry	Television film
1994–1995	Due South	Mr. Vecchio / Ray's Dad	4 episodes
1995	Forever Knight	Oleg Petrashenko	Episode: "Beyond the Law"
1995	TekWar	Alessandro Rossi	2 episodes
1995	Harrison Bergeron	Commissioner Benson	Television film
1995	Kung Fu: The Legend Continues	Josef	Episode: "Brotherhood of the Bell"
1996	Undue Influence	Coroner	Television film
1996	Traders	Edgar Bullock	Episode: "Trudy Kelly"
1997	The Don's Analyst	Anthony	Television film
1997	La Femme Nikita	Jovan Mijovich	2 episodes
1997	Groundling Marsh	Mr. Tree Elder (voice)	Episode: "Bumble-Bird Blunder"
1997	Balls Up	Leon	Television film
1997–1999	Earth: Final Conflict	Barry Calvert	8 episodes
1998	Witness to Yesterday	Niccolò Machiavelli	Episode: "Niccolò Machiavelli"
1998	Silver Surfer	Kiar (voice)	Episode: "Second Foundation"
1998	Rescuers: Stories of Courage: Two Families	US Colonel Rosenthal	Television film
2001	Doc	Mike Kincaid	Episode: "You Gotta Have Heart"
2001	Soul Food	Harvey Lynch	Episode: "Sex and Money"
2001–2002	The Associates	Arthur Harris	10 episodes
2002	The 5th Quadrant	Mayor Pedro Rodgerguiz	Episode: "I'm Gonna Git You Goatsucka"
2002	Nero Wolfe	Carl Heydt	Episode: "Murder Is Corny"
2003	Finding John Christmas	Dr. Merkatz	Television film
2005	1-800-Missing	Al Wheeling	Episode: "And the Walls Come Tumbling Down"
2006	Secret Files of the Inquisition	Various roles	2 episodes
2009, 2011	Flashpoint	Detective Jaffee	2 episodes
2012	The Firm	Prison Warden	Episode: "Chapter Twelve"
2013	Perfect Storm: Disasters That Changed The World	Justinian the Great	Episode: "Dark Age Volcano"
2015	Hannibal	Signore Albizzi	2 episodes
