= Steve Allen =

American TV personality (1921–2000)

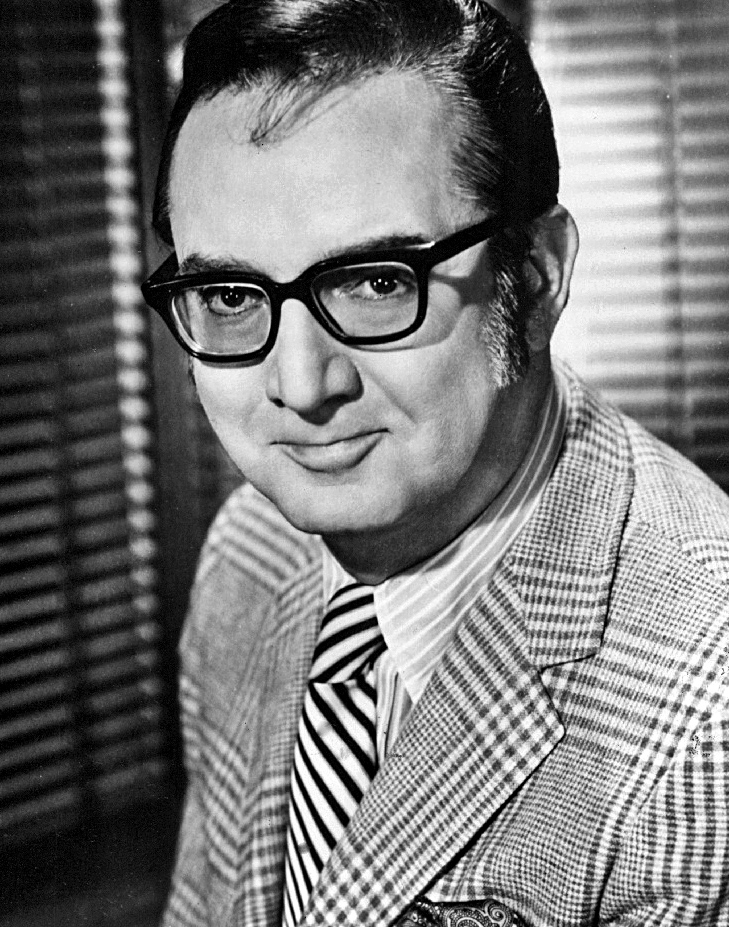
- Allen in 1977
- Born: Stephen Valentine Allen; December 26, 1921; New York City, U.S.
- Died: October 30, 2000 (aged 78); Los Angeles, California, U.S.
- Resting place: Forest Lawn Memorial Park
- Occupations: Comedian; television personality; radio personality; actor; musician; composer; writer
- Years active: 1940–2000
- Known for: Co-creator and first host of The Tonight Show
- Political party: Democratic
- Spouses: Dorothy Goodman (m. 1943; div. 1952); Jayne Meadows (m. 1954)
- Children: 4
- Website: steveallen.com

Stephen Valentine Patrick William Allen (December 26, 1921 – October 30, 2000) was an American television and radio personality, comedian, musician, composer, writer, and actor. Though he got his start in radio, he is best known for his extensive network television career.

Allen gained national attention as a guest host on Arthur Godfrey's Talent Scouts. In 1954, he achieved further national fame as the co-creator and first host of The Tonight Show, which was the first late-night nationwide television talk show. He then went on to host numerous game and variety shows, including his own The Steve Allen Show, I've Got a Secret, and The New Steve Allen Show. He was a regular panel member on CBS's What's My Line? and, from 1977 until 1981, he wrote, produced, and hosted the award-winning public broadcasting show Meeting of Minds, a series of historical dramas presented in a talk format.

Allen was a pianist and a prolific composer. By his own estimate, he wrote more than 8,500 songs, some of which were recorded by numerous leading singers. Allen won the 1964 Grammy Award for Best Original Jazz Composition for "Gravy Waltz," for which he wrote the lyrics. He also wrote more than 50 books, including novels, children's books, and books of opinions, including his final book, Vulgarians at the Gate: Trash TV and Raunch Radio (2001).

In 1996, Allen was presented with the Martin Gardner Lifetime Achievement Award from the Committee for Skeptical Inquiry (CSICOP). He has two stars on the Hollywood Walk of Fame and The Steve Allen Theater in Hollywood named in his honor.

== Early life ==
Allen was born in New York City, the only child of Billy Allen (né Carroll Abler), of German ancestry, and Belle Montrose (born Isabelle Donohue) a husband-and-wife vaudeville comedy team. His birth name was Stephen Valentine Allen, but he later acquired two additional names, Patrick and William, during his childhood. He got the middle name Valentine from vaudeville actor, Val Stanton who was a close friend of the family. His father died when he was an infant. Allen was raised on the South Side of Chicago largely by his mother's Irish Catholic family. Milton Berle called Allen's mother "the funniest woman in vaudeville."

Allen ran away from home at 16 and described in interviews the ease with which he took to begging.

Allen's first radio job was on station KOY, in Phoenix, Arizona, after he left Arizona State Teachers College (now Arizona State University), in Tempe, while a sophomore. He enlisted in the United States Army during World War II in 1943. Trained as an infantryman, he served his enlistment period at Camp Roberts, California. Due to frequent asthma attacks, he was given a medical discharge from the Army after serving five months. Afterward, he returned to Phoenix, before moving back to California.

== Career ==
=== Early career ===
==== Radio ====
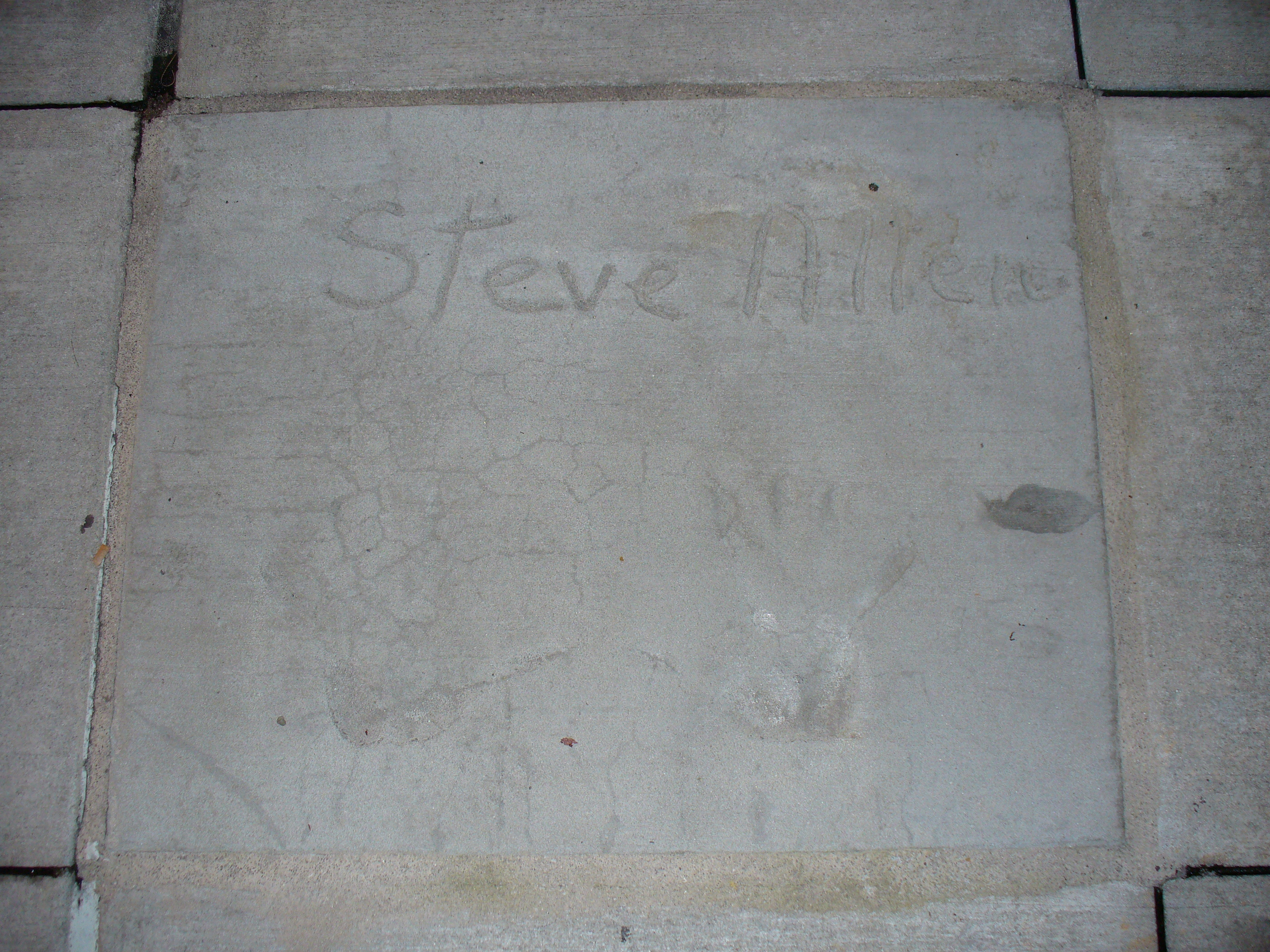
The handprints of Allen in front of Hollywood Hills Amphitheater at Walt Disney World's Disney's Hollywood Studios theme park

Allen became an announcer for radio KFAC in Los Angeles, then moved to the Mutual Broadcasting System in 1946, talking the station into airing his five-nights-a-week comedy show Smile Time, co-starring Wendell Noble. After Allen moved to CBS Radio's KNX in Los Angeles, his music-and-talk half-hour format gradually changed to include more talk in an hour-long late-night format, boosting his popularity and creating standing-room-only studio audiences.

During a show's segment, Allen went into the audience with a microphone to ad lib on the air for the first time. This became a commonplace part of his studio performances for many years. His program attracted a huge local following; as the host of a 1950 summer replacement show for the popular comedy Our Miss Brooks, he found himself in front of a national audience for the first time.

==== Television ====
Allen's first television experience came in 1949, when he answered an advertisement for a television announcer for professional wrestling. Knowing nothing about wrestling, he watched some shows to gain insight and discovered that the announcers did not have well-defined names for the wrestling holds: when he got the job, he created names for many of the holds, some of which still are in use. After the first match got under way, Allen began ad-libbing in a comedic style that had audiences outside the arena laughing. An example:

Leone gives Smith a full nelson now, slipping it up from either a half-nelson or an Ozzie Nelson. Now the boys go into a double pretzel bend with variations on a theme by Veloz and Yolanda.

After CBS radio gave Allen a weekly prime time show, CBS television believed he could be groomed for national television stardom and gave him his first network show. The Steve Allen Show premiered at 11 a.m. on Christmas Day, 1950, and was later moved to a thirty-minute, early evening slot. The new show required him to relocate, with his family, from Los Angeles to New York. It ran until 1952, after which CBS tried several different formats to showcase Allen's talent.

He achieved national attention in early January 1951, when he was pressed into last-minute service to guest host the hugely popular Arthur Godfrey's Talent Scouts when Godfrey was unable to appear. He turned one of Godfrey's live Lipton tea and soup commercials upside down, preparing tea and instant soup on camera, then pouring both into Godfrey's iconic ukulele. With the audience (including Godfrey, watching from Miami) laughing uproariously and thoroughly entertained, Allen gained major plaudits both as a comedian and as a host. Variety magazine editors who had seen the show wrote, "One of the most hilarious one-man comedy sequences projected over the TV cameras in many a day ... The guy's a natural for the big time."

Leaving CBS, Allen briefly hosted a talent-competition program on ABC called Talent Patrol in the first months of 1953.

At the same time, he became a regular on the popular panel television game show What's My Line? from January 1953, substituting for the suspended Hal Block, and replacing Block by March. He continued on the show until 1954, and returned frequently as a panelist until the series ended in 1967. He once appeared as a regular contestant on June 19, 1966, but the panel failed to guess his line, which was selling motorcycles; Allen at the time was co-owner of a Los Angeles dealership selling Honda motorcycles. Those introducing him as a panelist sometimes jokingly called him the son of panelist Fred Allen, but the two men were unrelated. He also revived and popularized the question "Is it bigger than a breadbox?" while trying to guess the products associated with What's My Line? contestants.

=== The Tonight Show ===
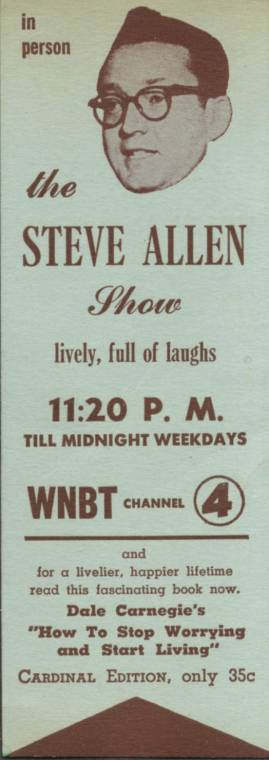
Bookmark promotion for Allen's late-night show

He then created The Knickerbocker Beer Show (also known as The Steve Allen Show), a late-night local New York talk/variety television program that debuted in July 1953 on local station WNBT-TV (now WNBC-TV). The following year, on September 27, 1954, the show went on the full NBC network as The Tonight Show, with fellow radio personality Gene Rayburn (who later went on to host hit game shows such as Match Game, 1962–1982) as the original announcer. The show ran from 11:30 p.m. to 1 a.m. on the East Coast, with Allen also hosting a truncated Knickerbocker Beer Show as a local lead-in from 11:15 to 11:30.

While Today developer Sylvester "Pat" Weaver often is credited as the Tonight creator, Allen often pointed out that he had created it earlier as a local New York show. Allen told his nationwide audience that first evening: "This is Tonight, and I can't think of too much to tell you about it except I want to give you the bad news first: This program is going to go on forever ... You think you're tired now. Wait until you see one o'clock roll around!" It was as host of The Tonight Show that Allen pioneered the "man on the street" comedic interviews and audience-participation comedy breaks that went on to become staples of late-night TV.

=== The Steve Allen Show ===
In June 1956, NBC offered Allen a new prime-time, Sunday night variety hour, The Steve Allen Show. NBC's goal was to dethrone CBS's top-rated The Ed Sullivan Show. The show included a typical run of star performers, including early television appearances by rock-and-roll pioneers Elvis Presley, Jerry Lee Lewis, and Fats Domino. Many popular television and film personalities were guest stars, including Bob Hope, Kim Novak, Errol Flynn, Abbott and Costello, Esther Williams, Jerry Lewis, Martha Raye, The Three Stooges, Sammy Davis, Jr., Shelley Winters, Edward Everett Horton, and a host of others.

The show's regulars were Tom Poston, Louis Nye, Bill Dana, Don Knotts, Pat Harrington, Jr., Dayton Allen, and Gabriel Dell. Dell was the only show-business veteran, having appeared in the Bowery Boys, Dead End Kids, Little Tough Guys, and East Side Kids film series. Allen's other regulars were relatively obscure performers prior to their stints with Allen, and all went on to stardom. The comedians in Allen's gang often were seen in his "Man in the Street" interviews about some topical subject. Poston would appear as a dullard who could not remember his own name. Nye's character was an effete advertising executive named Gordon Hathaway, known for greeting the host with "Hi ho, Steverino!" Dana played amiable Latino "Jose Jimenez." Knotts was an exceedingly jittery man who, when asked if he was nervous, invariably replied with an alarmed "No!". Harrington was the Italian immigrant and former golf-pro Guido Panzini. Dayton Allen, who had gotten his start playing various characters on the children's television series "Howdy Doody," played wild-eyed zanies answering any given question with the question "Why not?" Dell usually played straight men in sketches (policemen, newsmen, dramatic actors, etc.), and occasionally played the character Boris Nadel, a Bela Lugosi/Dracula lookalike.

Other recurring routines included "Crazy Shots" (also known as "Wild Pictures"), a series of sight gags accompanied by Allen on piano; Allen inviting audience members to select three musical notes at random, and then composing a song based on the notes; a satire on radio's long-running The Answer Man and a precursor to Johnny Carson's Carnac the Magnificent (sample answer: "Et tu, Brute." Allen's reply: "How many pizzas did you eat, Caesar?"); and overdramatic readings of real letters to the editor from New York City newspapers.

Allen's show also had one of the longest unscripted "crack-ups" on live television when Allen began laughing hysterically during "Big Bill Allen's Sports Roundup". Allen, known for his infectious high-pitched cackling laugh, laughed uncontrollably for over a minute with the audience laughing along, because, as he later explained, he caught sight of his unkempt hair on an off-camera monitor. He kept brushing his hair and changing hats to hide the messy hair, and the more he tried to correct his appearance the messier and funnier it got.

Allen helped the then-new Polaroid camera become popular by demonstrating its instant-picture capabilities during live commercials and amassed a huge financial windfall for his work because he had opted to be paid for it in Polaroid Corporation stock.

Allen remained host of "Tonight" for three nights a week (Monday and Tuesday nights were taken up by guest hosts for most of the summer of 1956; then by Ernie Kovacs through January) until early 1957 when he left the show to devote his attention to the Sunday night program. It was his (and NBC's) hope that The Steve Allen Show could defeat Ed Sullivan in the ratings. Nevertheless, Maverick often bested both in audience size. In September 1959, Allen relocated to Los Angeles and left Sunday night television (the 1959–'60 season originated from NBC Color City in Burbank as The Steve Allen Plymouth Show, on Monday nights). Back in Los Angeles, he continued to write songs, hosted other variety shows, and wrote books and articles about comedy.

After being canceled by NBC in 1960, the show returned in the fall of 1961—on ABC, as The New Steve Allen Show. Nye, Poston, Harrington, Dell, and Dayton Allen returned. New cast members were Joey Forman, Buck Henry, the Smothers Brothers, Tim Conway, and Allen's wife Jayne Meadows. The new version was canceled after fourteen episodes.

=== Later television projects ===
==== Westinghouse ====
From 1962 to 1964, Allen recreated The Tonight Show on a new show, The Steve Allen Show, which was syndicated by Westinghouse TV. The five-nights-a-week taped show was broadcast from an old vaudeville theater at 1228 North Vine Street in Hollywood that was renamed The Steve Allen Playhouse. The new Allen show could be programmed by local stations as an alternative to the networks' late-night shows, but many stations opted to broadcast the Allen show during the daytime hours.

The show was marked by the same wild, unpredictable stunts, and comedy skits that often extended across the side street to an all-night food outlet known as the Hollywood Ranch Market, where Allen had a hidden camera spying on unsuspecting shoppers. On one show, he had an elephant race down the side street, much to the annoyance of the occupants of the neighboring houses. On this show, he originated the term "little black things" in reference to anything regarding food, and the term "larger than Steve Allen's breadbox" in reference to any item under discussion. He also presented Southern California eccentrics, including health food advocate Gypsy Boots, quirky physics professor Dr. Julius Sumner Miller, wacko comic Professor Irwin Corey, and an early musical performance by Frank Zappa.

During one episode, Allen placed a telephone call to the home of Johnny Carson, posing as a rating company interviewer, asking Carson if the television was on, and what program he was watching. Carson did not immediately realize the caller was Allen. A rarity is an exchange between Allen and Carson about Carson's guests, permitting him to plug his own show on a competing network.

One notable program, which Westinghouse refused to distribute, featured Lenny Bruce during the time the comic repeatedly was being arrested on obscenity charges. Footage from this program was first telecast in 1998 in a Bruce documentary aired on HBO.

The show also featured many jazz songs played by Allen and members of the show's band, the Donn Trenner Orchestra, which included such virtuoso musicians as guitarist Herb Ellis and flamboyantly comedic hipster trombonist Frank Rosolino (whom Allen credited with originating the "Hiyo!" chant later popularized by Ed McMahon). While the show was not an overwhelming success in its day, David Letterman, Steve Martin, Harry Shearer, Robin Williams, and a number of other prominent comedians have cited Allen's "Westinghouse show," which they watched as teenagers, as being highly influential on their own comedic visions.

Allen later produced a second half-hour show for Westinghouse, titled Jazz Scene USA, which featured West Coast jazz musicians such as Rosolino, Stan Kenton, and Teddy Edwards. The short-lived show was hosted by Oscar Brown, Jr.

Westinghouse opposed Allen's insertion of a non-comedic segment, "Meeting of Minds", featuring actors playing historical figures engaged in serious and sometimes controversial discussion. However, Allen had creative control and insisted on its inclusion. When Westinghouse gave Allen an ultimatum to remove the segment he quit the show and was replaced by Regis Philbin.

==== Network shows ====
In 1964 Allen returned to network television as moderator of the game show I've Got a Secret (replacing original host Garry Moore). In the summer of 1967, he brought most of the regulars from over the years back with The Steve Allen Comedy Hour, featuring the television debuts of Rob Reiner, Richard Dreyfuss, and John Byner, and featuring Ruth Buzzi, who would become famous soon after on the comedy ensemble show Rowan & Martin's Laugh-In.

==== Filmways ====
In 1968 Steve Allen returned to syndicated variety/talk with a new show for Filmways, produced and co-written by Jeff Harris and Bernie Kukoff. The show was a free-wheeling, light-entertainment blend of comedy sketches, musical specialties, and conversation. It sometimes featured the same wacky stunts that would influence David Letterman in later years, including becoming a human hood ornament, jumping into vats of oatmeal and cottage cheese, and being slathered with dog food before allowing dogs backstage to feast on the food. During the run of this series, Allen also introduced Albert Brooks and Steve Martin to national audiences for the first time; Allen's talent coordinator for the Filmways show was Bill Saluga, who himself became a TV personality in the 1970s as "Raymond J. Johnson, Jr." ("You can call me Ray! Or you can call me Jay!"). The Filmways show was offered to local stations in both 60-minute and 90-minute versions; during each taping, after an hour had passed, Allen simply said goodbye to part of his audience and continued the show for those stations using the longer version. This Filmways show ran through 1971.

==== In the 1970s ====
Allen returned to guest host The Tonight Show for a single 1971 episode, and then became a semi-occasional guest host (15 episodes) from 1973 to 1977. After another long layoff, he guest-hosted two episodes in 1982, the last time he would host The Tonight Show.

A syndicated version of I've Got A Secret hosted by Allen and featuring panelists Pat Carroll and Richard Dawson was taped in Hollywood and aired during the 1972–1973 season. In 1977, he produced Steve Allen's Laugh-Back, a syndicated series combining vintage Allen film clips with new talk-show material reuniting his 1950s television gang.

==== Meeting of Minds ====
It elicited a kind of mail none of us connected with its production had ever seen. What appealed to the thousands who wrote, I believe, was that they were actually given the opportunity to hear ideas on television, a medium which otherwise presents only people, things, and actions.

— Steve Allen

From 1977 until 1981, Allen wrote, produced and hosted the award-winning show Meeting of Minds, which aired on the Public Broadcasting Service (PBS). The series brought together actors portraying historical figures such as Socrates, Marie Antoinette, Thomas Paine, Sir Thomas More, Attila the Hun, Karl Marx, Emily Dickinson, Charles Darwin, Oliver Cromwell, Daniel O'Connell, Galileo, and many others, as if transported from the past, all in a round table discussion and sometimes arguments. The dialogue covered issues such as racism, women's rights, crime and punishment, slavery, and religious tolerance. Jayne Meadows-Allen played most of the female characters, wisely eschewing Emily Dickinson, played by Katherine Helmond, and the Empress Tz'u-hsi, played by Beulah Quo. Associated Press television columnist Peter Boyer called it the "best talk show on television", created by the person who "invented the television talk show", and added:

The amazing thing about this show is that it actually comes off as a talk show, with a talk show's rhythm and pace. A truly conversational script is a tough trick to turn; Allen turns it with apparent ease.

Allen was a "philosophy fanatic" and avid reader of classic literature and history. He wrote the scripts based on the actual writings and actions of the guests, and as host would lead the conversations to different subjects. He described the show as "drama disguised as a talk show." Most of the female roles (Marie Antoinette, Catherine the Great, Florence Nightingale, et al.) were portrayed by Allen's wife, the actress Jayne Meadows – over her objections. She resisted monopolizing these roles, but Allen was insistent. She recalled in 1994, "He came to me and he said, 'You're gonna play Cleopatra.' I said, 'I am not! Go away. Go away!' And he calmly said, 'It's a divorce if you don't play it.'"

Allen first conceived the show in 1959 but took almost 20 years to make it become reality. He initially produced a version in 1971 that aired locally in Los Angeles and earned three Local Emmy Awards. But, although it received critical acclaim from Hollywood critics, the distributor chose not to broadcast it nationally, feeling it would not draw a large enough audience. Even PBS backed off on showing it, and many in the television industry felt the series was "too thoughtful" for the American public. Allen then produced the first shows at his own expense, which resulted in attracting major backers. It eventually aired nationally, beginning in 1977.

The series, consisting of six hour-long episodes per season, became enormously popular. Allen received a Personal Peabody Award in 1977 for creating and hosting "a truly original show." The award also recognized Meadows for her various portrayals. In 1981, the show won an Emmy for Outstanding Informational Series, and Allen's writing was Emmy nominated. It was the show Allen wanted to be remembered for, because he believed the issues and characters were timeless and would survive long after his death. A similar Canadian television series called Witness to Yesterday, created by Arthur Voronka, aired in 1974, three years after Allen's local Emmy Award-winning program. Allen appeared on a 1976 episode of Witness to Yesterday as composer-pianist George Gershwin.

==== In the 1980s ====
After television executive Fred Silverman became head of programming at NBC, he tried to revive some of the network's bygone successes. He signed Mitch Miller to reunite his old choral group for a new series of Sing Along with Mitch musical hours, and signed Miller to a pilot with an option for a 13-week series. The pilot aired but the series did not.

In the same vein, Silverman tried to return Steve Allen to the network. He hired Allen for two primetime projects: The Steve Allen Comedy Hour (1980), similar to Allen's 1950s variety hour, with comic characters and sketches; and The Big Show (1980), an attempt to stage spectacular events for television. A third Silverman project got the green light: Allen would return to his roots as a late-night star, in a weeknight revival of The Steve Allen Show. Silverman scheduled the hourlong show for five nights a week at 12:30 a.m. Eastern time, immediately following The Tonight Show. Allen was excited about the opportunity, only to be disappointed: Johnny Carson opposed the plan and voiced his objections to Silverman. Silverman's own schedule of new NBC shows was failing (Allen's Comedy Hour ran for only five episodes and The Big Show for only eleven) and NBC couldn't afford to alienate Carson, the network's most important asset, so the new Steve Allen show was abandoned.

From 1984 to 1986, Allen created and hosted Steve Allen's Music Room which aired on the newly formed Disney Channel. This was a talk show with jazz vibraphonist Terry Gibbs leading a studio band with the top Los Angeles musicians to include Conte Candoli, Pete Candoli, Carl Fontana, Med Flory, Plas Johnson, Alan Broadbent, and drummer Frankie Capp. 27-year-old Bill Maher was the announcer and "sidekick." The show featured musicians and entertainers including Melba Moore, Joe Williams, Paul Williams, Burt Bacharach, Anthony Newley, Rosemary Clooney, Lou Rawls, Dizzy Gillespie, Sarah Vaughan, and Henry Mancini. Allen spun off a similar show for Disney, Steve Allen's Comedy Room, this time with professional comedians talking about comedy styles.

From 1986 through 1988, for Allen hosted a daily, three-hour long comedy program, broadcast over the NBC Radio Network, featuring sketches and some of America's better-known comedians as regular guests. Allen's co-host was radio personality Mark Simone, and they were joined frequently by comedy writers Larry Gelbart, of M*A*S*H writing fame; Herb Sargent, best known for his writing for Saturday Night Live, and Bob Einstein, who created and portrayed the hapless daredevil stuntman character, Super Dave Osborne.

On October 30, 1988, Allen portrayed a radio newscaster in a remake of the famous The War of the Worlds broadcast of fifty years earlier. The 1988 version was produced by WGBH in Boston and picked up by 150 National Public Radio stations.

=== Songwriter ===
According to his own estimate, Allen was a prolific songwriter who wrote more than 8,500 songs, although only a small fraction of them were ever recorded. In one famous stunt, he made a bet with singer-songwriter Frankie Laine that he could write 50 songs a day for a week. Composing on public display in the window of Wallach's Music City, a Hollywood music store, Allen met the quota and won $1,000 from Laine. One of the songs, "Let's Go to Church (Next Sunday Morning)" became a chart hit for the duo of Jimmy Wakely and Margaret Whiting, hitting #13 pop and #2 country in 1950.

Allen began his recording career in 1951 with the album Steve Allen At The Piano for Columbia Records. He then signed with Decca Records, recording for their subsidiaries Brunswick Records and then Coral Records. Allen would release a mixture of novelty singles, jazz recordings and straight pop numbers for Decca throughout the 1950s, before switching to Dot Records in the 1960s.

In 1953 Allen added lyrics to "South Rampart Street Parade," a 1938 instrumental hit for Bob Crosby, written by Bob Haggart and Ray Bauduc. The vocal was introduced in the Donald O'Connor musical film Walking My Baby Back Home (1953). Though the song is best known as an instrumental, Allen's lyrics are occasionally performed.

Allen's best-known song, "This Could Be the Start of Something (Big)", dates from 1954. Though it was never a hit, the song was recorded by numerous artists, including Count Basie, Tony Bennett, Bobby Darin, Ella Fitzgerald, Mark Murphy Judy Garland, Aretha Franklin, Lionel Hampton, Claire Martin, and Oscar Peterson. Allen used it as the theme song of The Tonight Show in 1956–57, and as the theme song to many of his later television projects.

Allen wrote the lyrics for the standard "Theme from Picnic" from the film Picnic in 1955; the song was a No. 13 U.S. hit in a vocal version for The McGuire Sisters in 1956. The song, however, is chiefly remembered as an instrumental, often performed in a medley with "Moonglow," a popular song from 1933. Two instrumental versions charted in the U.S. top 5 in 1956, including a No. 1 hit version by Morris Stoloff. Because he did not write the music, Allen was not credited as a songwriter on the instrumental versions.

In 1957, Jerry Vale had a minor hit (US #52) with the Allen composition "Pretend You Don't See Her". The song was later covered by Bobby Vee, who would also chart with it (US #97) in 1965, and Vale's recording would later be heard in the 1990 gangster film GoodFellas.

"Gravy Waltz" was composed and originally performed by Ray Brown as an instrumental in the early 1960s. Allen later set words to it, and the collaboration won the 1964 Grammy Award for Best Original Jazz Composition. Issued as an instrumental single in 1963, it hit No. 64 on the US Billboard charts. Though the single version was credited to "Steve Allen With Donn Trenner And His Orchestra," Allen did not play on it. As well, though Allen was credited as co-songwriter for his lyrics, the hit single version was strictly an instrumental performance.

In the realm of theatre, Allen wrote the music and lyrics for the Broadway musical Sophie, which was based on the early career of the woman long billed as "The Last of the Red-Hot Mamas," entertainer Sophie Tucker. The book for the show was by Philip Pruneau. Libi Staiger and Art Lund were featured in the leading roles. "Sophie" opened at the Winter Garden Theatre in New York, after tryouts in three other cities, on April 15, 1963, to mostly unfavorable critical notices. It closed five days later, on April 20, after just eight performances. As Ken Mandelbaum noted in his 1991 book Not Since Carrie:

The show received consistently negative reviews in Columbus, Detroit, Philadelphia, and New York, and its problems were obvious: a cliché-ridden standard show-biz bio book, and an ordinary score ... The score went unrecorded (by the cast), although several months later Judy Garland sang three songs from Sophie on her CBS television series.

Though Mandelbaum doesn't mention it, Allen was a guest on that episode of The Judy Garland Show in which she featured Allen's songs from Sophie. Later, a "compiled" recording of Sophie was released with vocals by Allen, Libi Staiger, Garland, and others.

Allen's other produced musical was the 1969 London show Belle Starr, which starred Betty Grable as the American West character. Allen wrote the music, and was one of three credited lyricists. Belle Starr also received poor reviews in both its Glasgow tryout and in its London run, and closed after 12 performances. Like Sophie, the score went unrecorded by the cast. No compiled recording of the score has been made.

Allen also composed the score to Paul Mantee's James Bond–inspired film A Man Called Dagger (1967), with the score orchestrated by Ronald Stein.

By the 1970s, Allen was no longer actively recording his music. He continued to compose material, however, and in 1985, Allen wrote 19 songs for Irwin Allen's television mini-series Alice in Wonderland. The series starred his wife Jayne Meadows as the Queen of Hearts, among dozens of other celebrities.

After a long layoff from recording, in 1992 Allen issued the instrumental album Steve Allen Plays Jazz Tonight, which included interpretations of jazz classics as well as a handful of new original compositions.

In total he had three charting albums, Music for Tonight, (1955, Coral, No. 7 on Billboard's Top Albums chart), Funny Fone-Calls, (1963, Dot, No. 70 on the Billboard Top LPs) and Gravy Waltz & 11 Current Hits, (1963, Dot, No. 41 on the Billboard Top LPs).

=== Allen and rock music ===
While Allen often was critical of rock and roll music, he also often booked rock and roll acts on his television program The Steve Allen Show. It featured such acts as Fats Domino, Jerry Lee Lewis, Louis Jordan & the Tympany Five, the Treniers, and the Collins Kids. Allen famously scooped Ed Sullivan by being one of the first to present Elvis Presley on network television (after Presley had appeared on the Tommy and Jimmy Dorsey Stage Show and Milton Berle shows).

While Presley was an exceedingly controversial act at the time, "Allen found a way ... to satisfy the Puritans. He assured viewers that he would not allow Presley 'to do anything that will offend anyone.' NBC announced that a 'revamped, purified and somewhat abridged Presley' had agreed to sing while standing reasonably still, dressed in black tie." Allen avoided any controversy by inviting Presley to participate in the show's comedy. Elvis wore white tie and tailcoat while singing "Hound Dog" to a hound, which was attired with a top hat. The singer was also featured in a country-music sketch with Allen, Andy Griffith, and Imogene Coca.

Allen also appeared on the shows of other entertainers, even the mildly rock and roll program The Pat Boone Chevy Showroom on ABC; Boone had appeared as a guest on Allen's variety hour.

=== Actor ===
Allen was an occasional actor. He wrote and starred in his first film, the Mack Sennett comedy compilation Down Memory Lane, in 1949; Allen cast himself as a "TV disc jockey" showing Sennett's old comedy films on live television. His most famous film appearance was in 1956's The Benny Goodman Story, in the title role. The film, while an average biopic of its day, was hailed for its music, featuring many alumni of the Goodman band. Allen later recalled his one contribution to the film's music, used in the early scenes. The accomplished Benny Goodman no longer could produce the sound of a clarinet beginner, and that was the only sound Allen could produce on a clarinet.

In 1960, he appeared as the character "Dr. Ellison" in the episode "Play Acting" on CBS's anthology series The DuPont Show with June Allyson though his The Steve Allen Show had been in competition with the program the preceding season.

Allen sometimes appeared as himself (or as thinly disguised versions of himself) as a TV host in feature films (such as The Comic) and TV shows (Batman and The Snoop Sisters).

During the late 1980s, Allen and Jayne Meadows, his second wife, made three appearances on the television drama series St. Elsewhere. They played the estranged birth parents of the character Dr. Victor Ehrlich, who had given him up for adoption. And, in 1998, Allen and Meadows guest-starred in an episode of Homicide: Life on the Street.

Allen did voice work in two episodes of The Simpsons in the 1990s, appearing once as the electronically "altered" voice of Bart Simpson in season 3's "Separate Vocations", and as himself in season 6's "'Round Springfield". In 1997, Allen was a guest on the Space Ghost Coast to Coast episode "Boat Show."

=== Author ===
Allen was a comedy writer and author of more than 50 books, including several volumes of autobiography; children's books; a series of mystery novels; and numerous volumes of essays and opinions. Twenty of his books were concerned with his views about religion.

Among his better-known non-fiction works are Dumbth, a commentary on the American educational system, and Steve Allen on the Bible, Religion, and Morality. Allen also ostensibly authored a long-running series of mystery novels in the 1980s and '90s "starring" himself and Meadows as amateur sleuths. They later were revealed to have been ghostwritten by Walter J. Sheldon and, later, by Robert Westbrook.

Despite his lifelong reputation for political liberalism, morally, Allen was highly critical of vulgarity on both television and radio, and particularly strident in criticizing Howard Stern and other shock jocks. At the time of his death, he was completing a book on the subject called Vulgarians at the Gate, about what he saw as "the rising tide of smut on television."

=== Scientific skepticism ===
Allen, a freethinker and humanist, became an outspoken critic of organized religion and an active member of the scientific skepticism movement. He worked to promote critical thinking with such humanist and skeptical organizations as the Council for Media Integrity, a group that debunked pseudoscientific claims, and the California-based group The Skeptics Society. He wrote many pieces for their publication, Skeptic, on such topics as the Church of Scientology, genius, and the passing of science fiction giant Isaac Asimov.

Working with Paul Kurtz, publisher of Prometheus Books, Allen published 15 books, including Dumbth: The Lost Art of Thinking with 101 Ways to Reason Better and Improve Your Mind, which was reissued in 1998. He produced Gullible's Travels, an audiotape with original music and script that was read and sung by him and his wife "in order to introduce youngsters to the brain and its proper use." Wishing to counter the influence of the American Christian right, Allen wrote both a 1990 critique of the Bible (Steve Allen on the Bible, Religion and Morality) as well as a sequel. A sample passage from the book that illustrated his view of the Judeo-Christian-Islamic God reads:

The proposition that the entire human race — consisting of enormous hordes of humanity — would be placed seriously in danger of a fiery eternity characterized by unspeakable torments purely because a man disobeyed a deity by eating a piece of fruit offered him by his wife is inherently incredible.

In 2011 Allen was selected for inclusion in the Committee for Skeptical Inquiry's Pantheon of Skeptics.

=== Activities in later years ===
In the late 1970s and early 1980s, Allen recorded a solo piano album for the Pianocorder Contemporary Artists Series, joining such other pop pianists of the day as Liberace, Floyd Cramer, Teddy Wilson, Roger Williams, and Johnny Guarnieri. His solo album was popular.

In 1986, Allen was inducted into the Television Hall of Fame.

Allen was on the advisory board of the Los Angeles Student Film Institute.

Allen appeared in a public service announcement advocating for New Eyes for the Needy in the 1990s.

Steve Allen had last guest-hosted The Tonight Show in 1982, and made his last appearance on it on September 27, 1994, for the show's 40th-anniversary broadcast. Host Jay Leno was effusive in his praise, and actually knelt and kissed Allen's ring.

Allen also narrated The Unreal Story of Professional Wrestling, a documentary of professional wrestling from its origins to 1998.

== Personal life ==
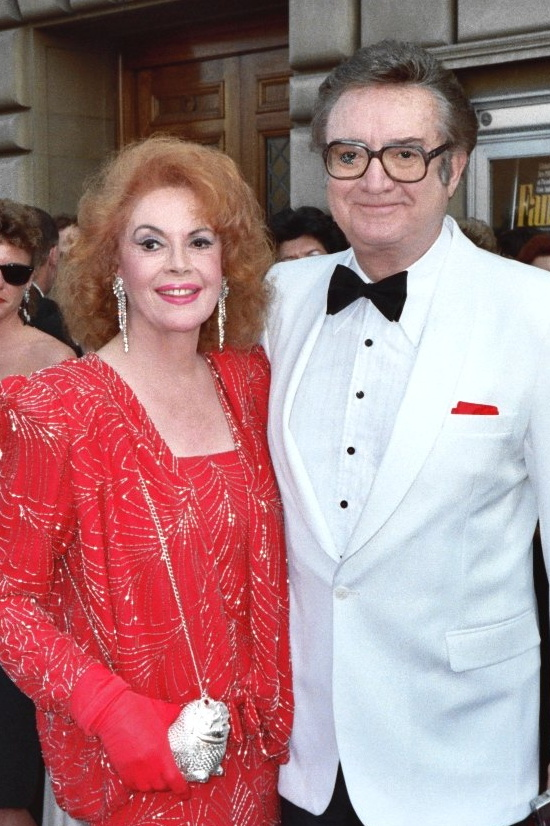
Steve Allen with Jayne Meadows in 1987

Allen and Dorothy Goodman married in 1943 and had three children: Steve Jr., Brian, and David. That marriage ended in 1952. Allen's second wife was actress Jayne Meadows. They had one son, Bill Allen, named for Steve's father. They were married in Waterford, Connecticut, on July 31, 1954, and remained married until his death in 2000.

In the late 1950s, author and philosopher Gerald Heard worked with psychiatrist Sidney Cohen to introduce intelligent, adventurous people to LSD, and Steve Allen was one of these subjects.

== Beliefs and politics ==
Although Allen was brought up Roman Catholic, he later became a secular humanist and Humanist Laureate for the Academy of Humanism, a member of CSICOP and the Council for Secular Humanism. He received the Rose Elizabeth Bird Commitment to Justice Award from Death Penalty Focus in 1998. He was a student and supporter of general semantics, recommending it in Dumbth and giving the Alfred Korzybski Memorial Lecture in 1992.

Allen was a Democrat, even though Jayne Meadows was a Republican. He endorsed Lyndon B. Johnson in the 1964 United States presidential election. In 1973, he cohosted the America Goes Public telethon, which raised money for the Democratic National Committee, and included a "Meeting of Minds" segment with actors portraying Abraham Lincoln, Theodore Roosevelt, Thomas Jefferson, and Cleopatra, speaking on democracy.

Allen wrote pamphlets on a variety of issues, including problems facing migrant workers, capital punishment and nuclear weapons proliferation. He once considered running for a seat in Congress from California, calling his politics "middle-of-the-road radicalism".

Despite his liberal position on free speech, he actively campaigned against obscenity on television and criticized comedians such as George Carlin and Lenny Bruce for their use of expletives in their stand-up routines; Allen admired their originality and humor but deplored what he considered their excessive profanity. His later concerns about the lewdness he heard on radio and television, particularly the programs of Howard Stern, caused him to make proposals to restrict the content of programs, allying himself with the Parents Television Council (PTC). His full-page advertisement on the subject appeared in newspapers just before his unexpected death.

== Death and legacy ==
On October 30, 2000, Allen was involved in a minor car crash while traveling to visit his youngest son at home in Los Angeles. A driver struck the side of Allen's car while backing out of a driveway, causing Allen to suffer a ruptured blood vessel, among other injuries, though he apparently did not realize he was seriously hurt. After Allen arrived at his son's home, he took a nap and died in his sleep. Allen was 78. At first, it was believed that he had a heart attack. However, Allen's autopsy revealed that he actually died from hemopericardium, caused by injuries sustained in the crash. Though the condition was partially caused by atherosclerosis, the death was ruled accidental. According to his widow, Jayne Meadows, "Typical of Steve, [who] was the dearest, sweetest man: He was hit by a man, backing into him, breaking all of his ribs, that pierced his heart ... and when he got out of the car, he said to the man, 'What some people will do to get my autograph.'"

Allen is buried at Forest Lawn Memorial Park in Hollywood Hills, Los Angeles. His grave has no headstone and is identified by a small numbered cemetery marker. Jayne Meadows was also interred in the Court of Liberty at Forest Lawn following her death in 2015. Allen has two stars on the Hollywood Walk of Fame – a television star at 1720 Vine Street and a radio star at 1537 Vine Street.
