= The Steve Allen Playhouse =

- La Mirada Theatre; Filmarte Theatre
- Interactive map of The Steve Allen Playhouse
- Address: 1228 North Vine Street; Hollywood, California; United States
- Coordinates: 34.0934501°N 118.3266188°W
- Capacity: 900

The Steve Allen Playhouse was a vaudeville and film theater in Hollywood, California. Located at 1228 North Vine Street, on the corner of La Mirada, it was originally named the La Mirada Theatre, and later the Filmarte Theatre.

== History ==
The building opened in 1906 as the La Mirada Theatre. In 1929, as the Filmarte Theatre, it was a movie house showing only non-American films, catering to the "various foreign colonies in east Los Angeles. Russians from Boyle Heights were among its best customers." It is the theater where Bob Hope performed his first stand-up act. The People Are Funny television program starring Art Linkletter was filmed there in the 1950s.

From 1962 to 1964 it was known as the Steve Allen Playhouse. Allen, in recreating what he invariably referred to as "The Old Tonight Show"—his 1954-57 stint as the first host of what NBC then referred to as Tonight! Starring Steve Allen—routinely used the street immediately to the north (La Mirada) and the adjacent Hollywood Ranch Market as extensions of the studio, and program, much in the way that David Letterman would later use various businesses around his CBS Late Night studio for comedic routines. When Allen and Westinghouse Broadcasting came to a sudden parting of the ways in 1964, the studio was used by the short-lived successor program, That Regis Philbin Show, Philbin's first national program.

During a renovation in 1990 the entire interior of the building burned, and it was later demolished. The site is now occupied by a mental health clinic.

== See also ==
- Category:Theatres in Hollywood, Los Angeles
