= The Best Of (Motörhead album) =

Greatest hits album by Motörhead
- Released: 28 August 2000
- Recorded: 1975–1999
- Genre: Heavy metal
- Length: 147:06
- Label: Metal-Is, Sanctuary

Motörhead chronology
Deaf Forever: The Best of Motörhead (2000)	The Best Of (2000)	Over the Top: The Rarities (2000)

Professional ratings
Review scores
Source	Rating
AllMusic	4/5 stars
The Encyclopedia of Popular Music	4/5 stars

The Best Of is a 2-CD compilation album by the band Motörhead, released in August 2000 on the Sanctuary Records subsidiary label Metal-Is.

== Recording ==
The Best Of includes 36 Motörhead tracks spanning the band's career from 1977 to 2000, including four previously unreleased live tracks recorded in 1981. It also includes three non-Motörhead tracks: Girlschool's cover version of Motörhead's "Bomber", a cover version of Johnny Kidd & The Pirates' "Please Don't Touch" performed by the Motörhead/Girlschool collaboration Headgirl, and Hawkwind's original version of "Motörhead", the song from which Motörhead frontman Lemmy took the band's name after being fired from Hawkwind. 14 of Motörhead's then-16 studio albums are represented, with March ör Die (1992) and Bastards (1993) excluded.

== Track listing ==
Disc 1
No.	Title	Writer(s)	Original Release	Length
1.	"Ace of Spades"	Lemmy Kilmister, Eddie Clarke, Phil "Philthy Animal" Taylor	1980 ~ Ace of Spades	2:50
2.	"Overkill"	Kilmister, Clarke, Taylor	1979 ~ Overkill	5:14
3.	"Bomber"	Kilmister, Clarke, Taylor	1979 ~ Bomber	3:44
4.	"Please Don't Touch" (Feat. Girlschool)	Frederick Heath, Guy Robinson	1981 ~ St. Valentine's Day Massacre	2:52
5.	"Motörhead"	Kilmister	1977 ~ Motörhead	3:13
6.	"No Class"	Kilmister, Clarke, Taylor	1979 ~ Overkill	2:42
7.	"Louie Louie" (Alternative Version)	Richard Berry	1978 ~ Louie Louie	2:54
8.	"Damage Case"	Kilmister, Clarke, Taylor, Mick Farren	1979 ~ Overkill	3:05
9.	"Too Late, Too Late"	Kilmister, Clarke, Taylor	1979 ~ Overkill (Single)	3:26
10.	"Dead Men Tell No Tales"	Kilmister, Clarke, Taylor	1979 ~ Bomber	3:08
11.	"Killed by Death"	Kilmister, Phil Campbell, Michael Burston, Pete Gill	1984 ~ No Remorse	3:56
12.	"Metropolis"	Kilmister, Clarke, Taylor	1979 ~ Overkill	3:37
13.	"Emergency" (Feat. Denise Dufort)	Kim McAuliffe, Kelly Johnson, Denise Dufort, Enid Williams	1981 ~ St. Valentine's Day Massacre	3:02
14.	"Tear Ya Down"	Kilmister, Clarke, Taylor	1979 ~ Overkill	2:42
15.	"White Line Fever (Stiff)"	Kilmister, Clarke, Taylor	1977 ~ Leaving Here / White Line Fever	2:46
16.	"Iron Horse / Born to Lose"	Taylor, Mick Brown, Guy Lawrence	1977 ~ Motörhead	5:22
17.	"City Kids"	Duncan Sanderson, Larry Wallis	1979 ~ On Parole	3:46
18.	"Motörhead" (Performed by Hawkwind)	Kilmister	1975 ~ Kings of Speed	3:06
19.	"Fire, Fire" (Live in 1981)	Kilmister, Clarke, Taylor	Unreleased Live Recording	2:47
20.	"Bite the Bullet / The Chase Is Better Than the Catch" (Live in 1981)	Kilmister, Clarke, Taylor	Unreleased Live Recording	6:56
Total length:				71:08

Disc 2
No.	Title	Writer(s)	Original Release	Length
1.	"Iron Fist"	Kilmister, Clarke, Taylor	1982 ~ Iron Fist	2:56
2.	"Heart of Stone"	Kilmister, Clarke, Taylor	1982 ~ Iron Fist	3:05
3.	"Bomber" (Performed by Girlschool)	Kilmister, Clarke, Taylor	1981 ~ St. Valentine's Day Massacre	3:38
4.	"Shine"	Kilmister, Brian Robertson, Taylor	1983 ~ Another Perfect Day	3:12
5.	"I Got Mine"	Kilmister, Robertson, Taylor	1983 ~ Another Perfect Day	5:26
6.	"Ain't My Crime"	Kilmister, Burston, Gill, Campbell	1986 ~ Orgasmatron	3:46
7.	"Doctor Rock"	Kilmister, Burston Gill, Campbell	1986 ~ Orgasmatron	3:42
8.	"The Chase Is Better Than the Catch"	Kilmister, Clarke, Taylor	1980 ~ Ace of Spades	4:19
9.	"Deaf Forever"	Kilmister, Burston, Gill, Campbell	1986 ~ Orgasmatron	4:29
10.	"Orgasmatron"	Kilmister, Burston, Gill, Campbell	1986 ~ Orgasmatron	5:26
11.	"Eat the Rich"	Kilmister, Burston, Campbell, Taylor	1987 ~ Rock 'N' Roll	4:38
12.	"Rock 'N' Roll"	Kilmister, Burston, Campbell, Taylor	1987 ~ Rock 'N' Roll	3:52
13.	"Dogs"	Kilmister, Burston, Campbell, Taylor	1987 ~ Rock 'N' Roll	3:52
14.	"The One to Sing the Blues"	Kilmister, Burston, Campbell, Taylor	1991 ~ 1916	3:12
15.	"Sacrifice"	Mikkey Dee, Kilmister, Campbell, Burston	1995 ~ Sacrifice	3:19
16.	"Overnight Sensation"	Dee, Kilmister, Campbell	1996 ~ Overnight Sensation	4:13
17.	"Snake Bite Love"	Dee, Kilmister, Campbell	1998 ~ Snake Bite Love	3:35
18.	"God Save the Queen"	Paul Cook, Steve Jones, John Lydon, Glen Matlock	2000 ~ We Are Motörhead	3:22
19.	"Shoot You in the Back" (Live in 1981)	Kilmister, Clarke, Taylor	Unreleased Live Recording	2:48
20.	"The Hammer" (Live in 1981)	Kilmister, Clarke, Taylor	Unreleased Live Recording	3:08
Total length:				75:58

NOTE: The live recordings were later featured on the re-release 40th anniversary edition of No Sleep 'til Hammersmith in 2021.

== Charts ==
Chart (2000–2004)	Peak position
German Albums (Offizielle Top 100)	32
Scottish Albums (OCC)	51
UK Albums (OCC)	52
UK Independent Albums (OCC)	10
UK Rock & Metal Albums (OCC)	2

Chart (2011)	Peak position
Finnish Albums (Suomen virallinen lista)	30

Chart (2016)	Peak position
Austrian Albums (Ö3 Austria)	46
Swiss Albums (Schweizer Hitparade)	74

== Certifications ==
Region	Certification	Certified units/sales
United Kingdom (BPI) 2000 release	Silver	60,000^{^}
United Kingdom (BPI) 2006 release	Silver	60,000^{‡}
^{^} Shipments figures based on certification alone.^{‡} Sales+streaming figures based on certification alone.
