= Deaf Forever: The Best of Motörhead =

Greatest hits album by Motörhead
- Released: 8 August 2000
- Genre: Heavy metal
- Length: 67:51
- Label: Castle Select

Motörhead chronology
We Are Motörhead (2000)	Deaf Forever: The Best of Motörhead (2000)	The Best Of (2000)

Professional ratings
Review scores
Source	Rating
AllMusic	3/5 stars

Deaf Forever: The Best of Motörhead is a compilation album by the band Motörhead, released on 8 August 2000 on Castle Select Records. The album was re-issued on DVD with a remixed 5.1 surround sound in 2002.

== Recording ==
The album compilation contains a modest amount of their more well-known Motörhead songs, while instead showcasing the more obscure fan-favorite songs. Also included is the Headgirl collaboration, a cover of "Please Don't Touch" by Johnny Kidd & the Pirates.

== Track listing ==
All tracks composed by Eddie Clarke, Ian Kilmister and Phil Taylor, unless otherwise stated.

Track List
No.	Title	Writer(s)	Original Release	Length
1.	"Ace of Spades"		1980 ~ Ace of Spades	2:48
2.	"Louie Louie (Alternative Version)"	Richard Berry	1978 ~ Louie Louie	2:47
3.	"Bomber"		1979 ~ Bomber	3:43
4.	"Iron Fist"		1982 ~ Iron Fist	2:53
5.	"No Class"		1979 ~ Overkill	2:41
6.	"Overkill"		1979 ~ Overkill	5:14
7.	"I'm the Doctor"		1982 ~ Iron Fist	2:43
8.	"Go to Hell"		1982 ~ Iron Fist	3:10
9.	"Bang to Rights"		1982 ~ Iron Fist	2:42
10.	"Lemmy Goes to the Pub" (Alternative Take on "Heart of Stone")		1982 ~ Iron Fist (1996 Reissue)	3:02
11.	"America"		1982 ~ Iron Fist	3:38
12.	"Speedfreak"		1982 ~ Iron Fist	3:27
13.	"Sex and Outrage"		1982 ~ Iron Fist	2:10
14.	"I Got Mine"		1983 ~ Another Perfect Day	5:24
15.	"All the Aces"		1979 ~ Bomber	3:25
16.	"Dirty Love"		1980 ~ Ace of Spades (Single)	2:56
17.	"Please Don't Touch"	Johnny Kidd, Guy Robinson	1981 ~ St. Valentine's Day Massacre	2:49
18.	"Motörhead" (Live in 1981)	Kilmister	1981 ~ No Sleep 'til Hammersmith	3:33
19.	"The Chase Is Better than the Catch"		1980 ~ Ace of Spades	4:18
20.	"Deaf Forever"	Kilmister, Phil Campbell, Michael Burston, Pete Gill	1986 ~ Orgasmatron	4:28

== Personnel ==
- Lemmy (Ian Kilmister) – bass, vocals
- "Fast" Eddie Clarke – guitar
- Phil "Philthy Animal" Taylor – drums
- Phil "Wizzo" Campbell – guitar
- Pete Gill – drums
- Würzel – guitar

DVD production

- Ken Caillat, John Trickett – executive producers
- Randy Glenn – quality control
- Janelle Guillot – voice-over
- Melinda Pepler – production coordinator
- Kristian Storli – authoring
- Claus Trelby – engineer, audio supervisor
- Charlie Watts – mastering
- Chuck Ybarra – graphic design

== Release history ==
Date	Label	Format	Catalog
8 August 2000	Import	CD	86502
2002	Silverline	CD	288054
2002	Silverline	CD	288055
1 November 2005	Silverline	DualDisc	284517
