= Over the Top: The Rarities =

Compilation album by Motörhead
- Released: 26 September 2000
- Genre: Heavy metal
- Length: 36:40
- Label: Castle, Sanctuary
- Compiler: Steve Hammonds, Julian Wall

Motörhead chronology
The Best Of (2000)	Over the Top: The Rarities (2000)	Hammered (2002)

Professional ratings
Review scores
Source	Rating
AllMusic	2/5 stars
The Encyclopedia of Popular Music	3/5 stars

Over the Top: The Rarities is a compilation album by the band Motörhead, released in 2000 on the Sanctuary Records label. It features rare alternative recordings of several songs throughout the band's history.

== Recording ==
Most of the included tracks are alternative versions of well-known early Motörhead songs such as "Capricorn," as well as two songs under new unofficial titles; "Lemmy Goes to the Pub" (alternate version of "Heart of Stone") and "Same Old Song, I'm Gone" (alternative of "Remember Me, I'm Gone"). Also included is a collaboration with Girlschool, a recording of "Please Don't Touch" under the combined band name of Headgirl.

== Track listing ==
All songs writing by Kilmister, Clarke, Taylor except where noted.

No.	Title	Writer(s)	Original album	Length
1.	"Tear Ya Down" (Instrumental Version)		1979 ~ Overkill (1996 Reissue)
2.	"Louie, Louie" (Alternative Version)	Richard Berry	1979 ~ Overkill (1996 Reissue)
3.	"Over the Top"		1979 ~ "Bomber" (Single)
4.	"Please Don't Touch" (Feat. Girlschool)	Johnny Kidd, Guy Robinson	1981 ~ St. Valentine's Day Massacre
5.	"Emergency" (Feat. Denise Dufort)	Denise Dufort, Kelly Johnson, Kim McAuliffe, Enid Williams	1981 ~ St. Valentine's Day Massacre
6.	"Over the Top" (Live in 1981)		1981 ~ "Motörhead" (Live Single)
7.	"Capricorn" (Live Alternative Version)		1981 ~ No Sleep 'til Hammersmith (1996 Reissue)
8.	"Train Kept A-Rollin'" (Live in 1980)	Tiny Bradshaw, Lois Mann	1981 ~ No Sleep 'til Hammersmith (1996 Reissue)
9.	"(Don't Let 'Em) Grind Ya Down" (Alternative Version)		1982 ~ Iron Fist (1996 Reissue)
10.	"Lemmy Goes to the Pub" (Alternative Take on Heart of Stone)		1982 ~ Iron Fist (1996 Reissue)
11.	"Same Old Song, I'm Gone" (Alternative Take on Remember Me, I'm Gone)		1982 ~ Iron Fist (1996 Reissue)
12.	"(Don't Need) Religion" (Live in 1983)		1983 ~ "Shine"

== Personnel ==
Motörhead

- Lemmy Kilmister – lead vocals (all songs except track 1), bass (all songs)
- "Fast" Eddie Clarke – lead guitar (tracks 1 - 11), backing vocals (tracks 1 - 11)
- Phil "Philthy Animal" Taylor – drums (tracks 1 - 3 & 6 - 12)
- Brian "Robbo" Robertson - lead guitar (track 12)

Girlschool

- Kim McAuliffe - rhythm guitar (track 4), backing vocals (track 4)
- Kelly Johnson - lead guitar (track 4), lead vocals (track 4)
- Enid Williams - bass (track 4), backing vocals (tracks 4)
- Denise Dufort - drums (tracks 4 - 5)
