= No Remorse (Motörhead album) =

Compilation album by Motörhead
- Released: 7 September 1984
- Genres: Heavy metal; hard rock
- Length: 83:34
- Label: Bronze
- Producer: Vic Maile

Motörhead chronology
Another Perfect Day (1983)	No Remorse (1984)	Orgasmatron (1986)

Singles from No Remorse
- 1. "Killed by Death" Released: 24 August 1984

No Remorse is a compilation album by the English rock band Motörhead, released in September 1984. The album provides an overview of the band's time with Bronze Records and also includes four newly recorded tracks. It is the final album the band released on Bronze Records, with the new material being the first to feature the band's new line-up of Lemmy, Phil Campbell, Würzel, and Pete Gill.

== Recording ==
After touring in support of their 1983 album Another Perfect Day, guitarist Brian "Robbo" Robertson and drummer Phil "Philthy Animal" Taylor left Motörhead and eventually decided to form a new band together called Operator. It had been Taylor who had suggested Motörhead hire Robertson to replace longtime guitarist "Fast" Eddie Clarke, who left the band after recording 1982's Iron Fist. In the Motörhead documentary The Guts and the Glory, Taylor explains:

"..I had a good talk to myself and thought, 'Well, maybe it's about time I move on,' you know. 'Cause I enjoyed playing with Robbo so much, maybe I'll get a band together with him, or something like that. I didn't really have a plan.."

In his memoir White Line Fever Lemmy reflects on Taylor's departure:

"..I hadn't been seeing much of Phil but I had been getting the impression that he wasn't really that keen any more. Although we didn't discuss his reasons for leaving the band, I think part of it was because he wanted to become a serious musician, or whatever it is people think heavy metal isn't which, if you ask me, is total bullshit...And our troubles with Brian Robertson aside, Philthy was one of the biggest Thin Lizzy fans in existence...There we were with auditions to do that day with two guitarists who had travelled from Cheltenham and Wales. Now I didn't have a drummer! But I have to admit, Phil was a gentleman about the whole thing...He did leave decently, unlike some of Motörhead's former members.."

Taylor informed Lemmy he was leaving shortly after the hiring of guitarists Phil Campbell, whose band Persian Risk had played shows with Motörhead, and Michael Burston, who had gained a reputation playing in Wiltshire clubs and pubs and received the nickname Würzel after the children's TV character Worzel Gummidge. At the suggestion of Campbell, ex-Saxon drummer Pete Gill was quickly brought in as Taylor's replacement.

Lemmy recalled later that friction between the band and their label, Bronze, began in 1982 with the sudden departure of guitarist "Fast" Eddie Clarke. The label had been unhappy with Robertson's hiring as Clarke's replacement, and with little faith in the band's brand new lineup, a decision was made to release a "greatest hits"-style compilation of the band's earlier material. Lemmy viewed this as an indication that the label were "readying the death knell" for Motörhead, and thus he insisted that the album that would become No Remorse contain some new material.

Between 19 and 25 May 1984, Motörhead's new lineup recorded six songs at Britannia Row Studios in London: "Killed by Death", "Snaggletooth", "Steal Your Face", "Locomotive", and two different songs both called "Under the Knife". The first four of these songs concluded each side of the double album vinyl release. The two versions of "Under the Knife" were released on 1 September 1984 as the B-side of the "Killed by Death" 12" vinyl pressing. Lemmy was tasked with the job of selecting the tracks for the compilation album, and he also provided a commentary about each song.

== Release ==
In addition to the usual cardboard sleeve, the original LPs were also available in a real leather sleeve which had silver on black artwork, completely reworked by Joe Petagno in much finer detail than the original with various differences (such as an iron cross). There was a cassette version released in a leather pouch with wording mimicking the Government Health Warning often found on a cigarette packet, about the contents being potentially damaging to the health. They also did a television advert for the album, which featured a brief medley of several songs before Lemmy's voice was heard to declare, "No Remorse... go out and get it!"

Motörhead promoted the album through the No Remorse – Death on the Road tour between 24 October – 7 November 1984. They kicked it off with an appearance on ITV's early-morning children's show The Saturday Starship. The set, which also included "Iron Fist", "Ace of Spades", and "Overkill", was performed in the car park of the Central TV studios, Birmingham, prompting complaints about the noise. On 26 October, the band made a live appearance on the Channel 4 pop/rock music programme The Tube, playing "Killed by Death," "Steal Your Face" and "Overkill." However, the programme credits came up during "Steal Your Face," which faded out as the broadcast concluded. "Overkill" would eventually be broadcast some 20 years later, during a retrospective Best of the Tube TV series.

Motörhead would later record a song called No Remorse, which is on their 2002 album Hammered.

== Reception ==
Professional ratings
Review scores
Source	Rating
AllMusic	5/5 stars
Robert Christgau	A−
Collector's Guide to Heavy Metal	7/10
The Encyclopedia of Popular Music	4/5 stars
The Great Rock Discography	8/10
Spin Alternative Record Guide	9/10

From contemporary reviews, Don Snowden of The Boston Phoenix declared the album as "a thoughtfully packaged double-album retrospective" that was a "relentless onslaught leaves one more invigorated than enervated" due to songs being short. Snowden concluded that the album "captures and encapsulates its subject in one tidy package. You don’t need to buy another Motorhead album after this one – if the much-bruited hardcore/metal crossover ever comes to pass, No Remorse will prove that Motorhead got there first."

The AllMusic review states:

"..There have been dozens and dozens of Motörhead compilations released over the decades, but the first one remains definitive, even if it's not perfect...No Remorse is to Motörhead what We Sold Our Soul for Rock 'n' Roll is to Black Sabbath – an age-old collection that every metalhead seemed to own at some point, the one that seemed to define the band for generations on end. No Remorse is one of those classic albums, no doubt.."

In 2017, it was ranked 7th on Rolling Stone's list of "100 Greatest Metal Albums of All Time"; the only compilation on the list. Commenting on this choice for a band that never changed its formula, J. D. Considine said:

"It seems more fitting, then, to represent Motörhead with an anthology. No Remorse may offer 29 versions of what is essentially the same thing, yet every track is singularly amazing: the yelping, bad luck refrain to "Ace of Spades," the locomotive thunder beneath "Overkill," the live-wire guitar on "Bomber," the genius stupidity of "Killed by Death," or the amphetamine overdrive of the live "Motorhead" from No Sleep 'til Hammersmith. Sometimes, a good formula is all you really need."

== Track listing ==
All tracks are written by Kilmister, Clarke, Taylor except where noted.

Side A
No.	Title	Writer(s)	Original release	Length
1.	"Ace of Spades"		1980 ~ Ace of Spades	2:48
2.	"Motorhead" (Live in 1981)	Kilmister	1981 ~ No Sleep 'til Hammersmith	3:37
3.	"Jailbait"		1980 ~ Ace of Spades	3:26
4.	"Stay Clean"		1979 ~ Overkill	2:42
5.	"Too Late, Too Late" (Live in 1980)		1980 ~ The Golden Years	3:14
6.	"Killed by Death"	Kilmister, Michael "Würzel" Burston, Phil "Zööm" Campbell, Pete Gill	New recording	4:42

Side B
No.	Title	Writer(s)	Original release	Length
7.	"Bomber" (Live in 1981)		1981 ~ No Sleep 'til Hammersmith	3:17
8.	"Iron Fist"		1982 ~ Iron Fist	2:54
9.	"Shine"	Kilmister, Taylor, Brian "Robbo" Robertson	1983 ~ Another Perfect Day	3:11
10.	"Dancing on Your Grave"	Kilmister, Taylor, Robertson	1983 ~ Another Perfect Day	4:30
11.	"Metropolis"		1979 ~ Overkill	3:37
12.	"Snaggletooth"	Kilmister, Burston, Campbell, Gill	New recording	3:51

Side C
No.	Title	Writer(s)	Original release	Length
1.	"Overkill" (Single Version)		1979 ~ Overkill (Single)	3:18
2.	"Please Don't Touch" (feat. Girlschool)	Johnny Kidd, Guy Robinson	1981 ~ St. Valentine's Day Massacre	2:49
3.	"Stone Dead Forever"		1979 ~ Bomber	4:54
4.	"Like a Nightmare"		1979 ~ No Class	4:28
5.	"Emergency" (feat. Denise Dufort)	Denise Dufort, Kelly Johnson, Kim McAuliffe, Enid Williams	1981 ~ St. Valentine's Day Massacre	3:00
6.	"Steal Your Face"	Kilmister, Burston, Campbell, Gill	New recording	4:31

Side D
No.	Title	Writer(s)	Original release	Length
7.	"Louie, Louie"	Richard Berry	1978 ~ Louie, Louie	2:46
8.	"No Class"		1979 ~ Overkill	2:41
9.	"Iron Horse / Born to Lose" (Live in 1980)	Taylor, Mick Brown, Guy Lawrence	1981 ~ No Sleep 'til Hammersmith	3:54
10.	"(We Are) the Road Crew"		1980 ~ Ace of Spades	3:12
11.	"Leaving Here" (Live in 1980)	Lamont Dozier, Brian Holland, Edward Holland	1980 ~ The Golden Years	3:05
12.	"Locomotive"	Kilmister, Burston, Campbell, Gill	New recording	3:25

- The original single CD – issued by Castle (CLACD 121) in the UK, Europe and the rest of the world, and by Roadracer (RRD 9354) in North America – omitted the tracks "Louie, Louie" and "Leaving Here" from the original vinyl and cassette release due to time restrictions. The complete album was reissued in Japan on two CDs in 1991 (TECP-40687/88) and 1993 (VICP-40098~99).

=== 1996 & 2005 reissues ===
The 1996 Castle and 2005 Sanctuary reissues, which contain all 24 songs, are notable not only for the addition of five bonus tracks, but also for using alternate mixes/edits of certain tracks, as noted below.

CD1
No.	Title	Writer(s)	Original release	Length
1.	"Ace of Spades"	Kilmister, Clarke, Taylor	1980 ~ Ace of Spades	2:48
2.	"Motörhead" (live in 1981)	Kilmister	1981 ~ No Sleep 'til Hammersmith	3:37
3.	"Jailbait"	Kilmister, Clarke, Taylor	1980 ~ Ace of Spades	3:33
4.	"Stay Clean"	Kilmister, Clarke, Taylor	1979 ~ Overkill	2:42
5.	"Too Late, Too Late"	Kilmister, Clarke, Taylor	1979 ~ Overkill (Single)	3:26
6.	"Killed by Death"	Kilmister, Burston, Campbell, Gill	New recording	4:42
7.	"Bomber"	Kilmister, Clarke, Taylor	1979 ~ Bomber	3:43
8.	"Iron Fist"	Kilmister, Clarke, Taylor	1982 ~ Iron Fist	2:54
9.	"Shine"	Kilmister, Taylor, Robertson	1983 ~ Another Perfect Day	3:11
10.	"Dancing on Your Grave"	Kilmister, Taylor, Robertson	1983 ~ Another Perfect Day	4:30
11.	"Metropolis"	Kilmister, Clarke, Taylor	1979 ~ Overkill	3:37
12.	"Snaggletooth"	Kilmister, Burston, Campbell, Gill	New recording	3:51

CD2
No.	Title	Writer(s)	Original release	Length
1.	"Overkill"	Kilmister, Clarke, Taylor	1979 ~ Overkill	5:12
2.	"Please Don't Touch" (feat. Girlschool)	Kidd, Robinson	1981 ~ St. Valentine's Day Massacre	2:49
3.	"Stone Dead Forever"	Kilmister, Clarke, Taylor	1979 ~ Bomber	4:54
4.	"Like a Nightmare"	Kilmister, Clarke, Taylor	1979 ~ No Class	4:28
5.	"Emergency" (feat. Denise Dufort)	Dufort, Johnson, McAuliffe, Williams	1981 ~ St. Valentine's Day Massacre	3:00
6.	"Steal Your Face"	Kilmister, Burston, Campbell, Gill	New recording	4:31
7.	"Louie, Louie" (alternative version)	Berry	1979 ~ Overkill (1996 Reissue)	2:55
8.	"No Class"	Kilmister, Clarke, Taylor	1979 ~ Overkill	2:41
9.	"Iron Horse / Born to Lose" (live in 1980)	Taylor, Brown, Lawrence	1981 ~ No Sleep 'til Hammersmith	3:48
10.	"(We Are) the Road Crew"	Kilmister, Clarke, Taylor	1980 ~ Ace of Spades	3:12
11.	"Leaving Here" (live in 1980)	Dozier, Brian & Edward Holland	1980 ~ The Golden Years	3:05
12.	"Locomotive"	Kilmister, Burston, Campbell, Gill	New recording	3:25

Castle Communications 1996 CD reissue bonus tracks
No.	Title	Writer(s)	Original release	Length
13.	"Under the Knife (Slow)"	Kilmister, Burston, Campbell, Gill	1984 ~ Killed by Death	3:50
14.	"Under the Knife (Fast)"	Kilmister, Burston, Campbell, Gill	1984 ~ Killed by Death	4:34
15.	"Masterplan" (feat. the Plasmatics) (Lemmy on vocals)	Richie Stotts, Rod Swenson	1982 ~ Stand by Your Man	2:55
16.	"No Class" (feat. the Plasmatics) (Wendy O. Williams on vocals)	Kilmister, Clarke, Taylor	1982 ~ Stand by Your Man	2:32
17.	"Stand by Your Man" (feat. the Plasmatics)	Billy Sherrill, Tammy Wynette	1982 ~ Stand by Your Man	3:06

- The reissued 2CD versions have included the Stand by Your Man EP done with the Plasmatics, commonly thought of as the reason Clarke left the band. This is the only reissue of the full EP outside its original release in 1982, although "Masterplan" and "Stand by Your Man" have appeared on other compilations.
- The 2015 2LP reissue of the album uses the 1996/2005 mixes, excluding bonus tracks.

== Personnel ==
- Lemmy Kilmister – lead vocals except "Emergency", bass on all tracks
- "Fast" Eddie Clarke – lead vocals on "Emergency", guitar on tracks A1-5, B7, 8 & 11, C1-5, D7-11 – CD2 15, 16 and 17, backing vocals
- Phil "Philthy Animal" Taylor – drums on tracks A1-5, B7-11, C1-5, D7-11 – CD2 15, 16

- Denise Dufort – drums on "Emergency"

- Brian "Robbo" Robertson – guitar on tracks B9 and B10
- Michael "Würzel" Burston – guitar on tracks A6, B12, C6, D12, – CD2 13 and 14
- Phil "Zööm" Campbell – guitar on tracks A6, B12, C6, D12, – CD2 13 and 14
- Pete Gill – drums on tracks A6, B12, C6, D12, – CD2 13 and 14

=== Production ===
Producers:

- Jimmy Miller – producer (tracks: A4, A5, B11, C1, C3, C4, D7 and D8)
- Vic Maile – producer (tracks: A1, A2, A3, A6, B7, B12, C2, C5, C6, D9, D10, D11, D12 and CD2.13-14)
- Guy Bidmead – co-producer (tracks: A6, B12, C6, D12 and CD2.3-14)
- Eddie Clarke – producer (tracks: B8 and CD2.15–17)
- Will "Evil Red Neck" Reid Dick – producer (tracks: B8 and CD2.15–17)
- Tony Platt – producer, engineer (tracks: B9 and B10)

Engineers:

- Ashley Howe – engineer (tracks: A2 and D3)
- Trevor Hallesy – engineer (tracks: A4, A5, B7, B11, C1, C4 and D2)
- Charles Harrowell – engineer (track: B8)

Cover:

- Joe Petagno – Snaggletooth

== Charts ==
Chart (1984)	Peak position
UK Albums (Official Charts)	14

== Certifications ==
Region	Certification	Certified units/sales
United Kingdom (BPI)	Silver	60,000^{^}
^{^} Shipments figures based on certification alone.
