= Hit and Run (Girlschool album) =

Studio album by Girlschool
- Released: 10 April 1981
- Recorded: December 1980 – January 1981
- Studios: Jackson's Studios (Rickmansworth, England)
- Genre: Heavy metal
- Length: 35:51
- Label: Bronze
- Producer: Vic Maile

Girlschool chronology
St. Valentine's Day Massacre (1981)	Hit and Run (1981)	Live and More EP (1982)

Singles from Hit and Run
- 1. "Yeah Right" / "The Hunter" Released: 7 November 1980; 2. "Hit and Run" / "Tonight" Released: April 1981; 3. "C'mon Let's Go" / "Tonight (live)" Released: July 1981

Hit and Run is the second studio album by the British heavy metal band Girlschool, released in 1981 by Bronze Records.

== Overview ==
The album represented Girlschool's sophomore effort, and like its predecessor Demolition (1980) it was recorded at Jackson's Studios, England. The band were in the studio from December 1980 to January 1981 with Vic Maile again serving as producer.

Hit and Run is the most successful Girlschool album, having reached No. 5 in the UK Albums Chart, with the single of the title track climbing to No. 32 in the UK singles chart. The band appeared on the BBC show Top of the Pops on 16 April 1981, miming to the hit song. The 7-inch single (Bronze BRO 118) had "Tonight" as B-side, with the 10-inch adding the cover version of the famous ZZ Top song "Tush". Lead track "C'mon Let's Go" was featured in the Gemini Award winning 2005 documentary film Metal: A Headbanger's Journey.

The car on the cover is a 1972 Buick Riviera.

The album was reissued on CD in 2004 by Castle, a subsidiary of Sanctuary Records, with bonus tracks and extensive sleevenotes by Record Collector's Joe Geesin.

== Critical reception ==
Professional ratings
Review scores
Source	Rating
AllMusic	2.5/5 stars
Collector's Guide to Heavy Metal	7/10
Sounds	5/5 stars

In 2005, Hit and Run was ranked number 289 in Rock Hard magazine's book The 500 Greatest Rock & Metal Albums of All Time.

== Track listings ==
Side one
No.	Title	Music	Length
1.	"C'mon Let's Go"	Kim McAuliffe, Kelly Johnson	3:35
2.	"The Hunter"	McAuliffe, Johnson	3:15
3.	"(I'm Your) Victim"	McAuliffe, Denise Dufort	2:42
4.	"Kick It Down"	McAuliffe, Johnson	3:03
5.	"Following the Crowd"	Enid Williams, McAuliffe, Johnson	3:08
6.	"Tush" (ZZ Top cover)	Billy Gibbons, Dusty Hill, Frank Beard	2:16

Side two
No.	Title	Music	Length
7.	"Hit and Run"	McAuliffe, Johnson	3:08
8.	"Watch Your Step"	Williams, McAuliffe, Johnson	3:22
9.	"Back to Start"	Johnson, Williams	3:32
10.	"Yeah Right"	McAuliffe, Johnson, Dufort	3:21
11.	"Future Flash"	Johnson, McAuliffe	4:27

2004 remastered CD edition bonus tracks
No.	Title	Music	Source	Length
12.	"Please Don't Touch" (Performed with Motörhead)	Johnny Kidd, Guy Robinson	St. Valentine's Day Massacre EP	2:49
13.	"Bomber" (Motörhead cover)	Eddie Clarke, Ian Kilmister, Phil Taylor	St. Valentine's Day Massacre EP	3:28
14.	"Tonight"	Williams, McAuliffe, Johnson, Dufort	B-side to "Hit and Run" single	2:34
15.	"Demolition Boys" (live)	McAuliffe, Johnson	B-Side to "C'mon Let's Go" single	3:07
16.	"Tonight" (live)		B-side to "C'mon Let's Go" single	2:40
17.	"Yeah Right"		BBC Radio session broadcast on the Richard Skinner Show, 26 January 1981	2:35
18.	"The Hunter"		BBC Radio session broadcast on the Richard Skinner Show 26 January 1981	3:00
19.	"Kick It Down"		BBC Radio session broadcast on the Richard Skinner Show 26 January 1981	3:06
20.	"Watch Your Step"		BBC Radio session broadcast on the Richard Skinner Show 26 January 1981	3:08

=== Other Versions ===
Hit and Run did not get a proper release in North America. Instead compilation albums featuring the title and artwork from Hit and Run, and tracks from both Demolition and Hit and Run, were released. Canada and the United States each received their own unique releases.

In the United States Stiff Records released an album titled Hit and Run on both vinyl and cassette.

1981 US Release
No.	Title	Length
1.	"Hit and Run"	3:07
2.	"Watch Your Step"	3:20
3.	"Race with the Devil"	2:50
4.	"Yeah Right"	3:20
5.	"Not for Sale"	3:30
6.	"Future Flash"	4:26
7.	"C'mon Let's Go"	3:36
8.	"The Hunter"	3:13
9.	"Kick It Down"	3:02
10.	"Take It All Away"	3:40

The Canadian release was put out by Solid Gold Records and featured the same songs as the American release, however the order of the tracks was different.

1981 Canadian Vinyl Release
No.	Title	Length
1.	"Race with the Devil"	2:50
2.	"Hit and Run"	3:07
3.	"Watch Your Step"	3:20
4.	"Yeah Right"	3:20
5.	"Take It All Away"	3:40
6.	"Future Flash"	4:26
7.	"C'mon Let's Go"	3:36
8.	"The Hunter"	3:13
9.	"Kick It Down"	3:02
10.	"Not for Sale"	3:31

== Personnel ==
Band members

- Kim McAuliffe – rhythm guitar, vocals on track 4
- Kelly Johnson – lead guitar, vocals on tracks 1, 2, 7, 11, 12
- Enid Williams – bass, vocals on tracks 3, 5, 6, 8, 9, 10, 13, 14
- Denise Dufort – drums

Production

- Vic Maile – producer, engineer, mixing

== Charts ==
Chart (1981)	Peak position
Canada Top Albums/CDs (RPM)	50
Finnish Albums (The Official Finnish Charts)	17
New Zealand Albums (RMNZ)	49
UK Albums (Official Charts)	5

== Certifications ==
Region	Certification	Certified units/sales
Canada (Music Canada)	Gold	50,000^{^}
^{^} Shipments figures based on certification alone.

== Release history ==
Date	Region	Label	Catalogue	Format	Notes
10 April 1981	UK	Bronze	BRON 534	vinyl	included a limited pressing in red vinyl
1981	Europe	Bronze	203,556-320	vinyl	
1981	Japan	Bronze	VIP-6779	vinyl	
1981	Canada	Solid Gold	SGR 1003	vinyl	actually a compilation of songs from Demolition and Hit and Run
5 March 1982	USA	Stiff	USE 18	vinyl	actually a compilation of songs from Demolition and Hit and Run
1991	UK	Dojo/Castle	LOMA CD1	CD	published in a double album compilation with Demolition
2004	Worldwide	Castle/Sanctuary	CMRCD950	CD	
