= Stand by Your Man (EP) =

EP by Lemmy/Wendy O. Williams
- Released: 1982
- Recorded: May 1982
- Studio: Eastern Sound Studios, Toronto, Canada
- Genre: Punk rock
- Length: 8:37
- Label: Bronze
- Producer: Ian "Lemmy" Kilmister; Rod Swenson; Dan Hartman; The Company

Lemmy/Wendy O. Williams chronology
Iron Fist (1982)	Stand by Your Man (1982)	What's Words Worth? (1983)

Stand by Your Man is an EP released in 1982. It is a collaboration of the bands Motörhead and the Plasmatics. It is notorious as the reason "Fast" Eddie left Motörhead, more so than the bad reception the EP received. Lemmy and Wendy O. Williams had organised to do a duet of the famous Tammy Wynette country song, though most critics, and fans, to this day are baffled by the choice, Wendy coming from the punk scene in the mid-late 1970s and Lemmy from a mixture of Rock genres.

== Recording ==
Following the success of the Motörhead/Girlschool collaboration, St. Valentine's Day Massacre EP, Lemmy kept getting asked to do another collaboration. Having seen pictures of O. Williams and knowing of her reputation, alongside Lemmy's penchant for "making records with birds," the band flew to Toronto for a recording session with her group, the Plasmatics. Lemmy explained about the session:

"..Eddie was supposed to produce the tracks for us, and unfortunately he had (producer) Will Reid Dick – whom I generally refer to as Evil Red Dick – in tow again. The session was problematic to say the least. Wendy took a long time to get in tune, and it wound Eddie up. She tried her parts a few times and sounded terrible, I will say that. You'd think she was never going to get it, but I knew she would if I just worked with her. In addition to this, Eddie wasn't playing guitar – he was only working as producer. We were using Wendy's guitarist's from the Plasmatics, with me and Phil on bass and drums. Eddie wasn't acting terribly thrilled with the whole scenario and finally he said he was going out to eat, but we found him in the other room, sulking with Evil Red.."

Lemmy believes that if Dick had not been there, they could have worked through the problems, but ended up exchanging a few words and Clarke left the studio. Back at the hotel, drummer Phil "Philthy Animal" Taylor told Lemmy "Eddie's left the band". Clarke was replaced a week later by Thin Lizzy man, Brian Robertson. In the book Overkill: The Untold Story of Motorhead, biographer Joel McIver quotes Taylor saying:

"..we all knew it wasn't going to be a Stevie Wonder-meets-Paul McCartney production job. It was basically an over-the-top single...I said to him, well, that's no problem. Easy. If you want, you can put on the back of the single, 'Eddie Clarke is on no way involved with this. He hates it. He thinks it's a bunch of shit'...I still don't think that was his reason for leaving.."

It is more likely that Clarke left because of mounting tension with Kilmister, who had been unhappy with Clarke's production on the Iron Fist album and fed up with Clarke's continued threats to leave. In an interview with Scott Adams that appears on Clarke's official website, the guitarist insists:

"..I suppose at that time Motorhead had in fact gone as far as it could. I had not decided to quit. I was forced out by the other guys who for different reasons felt the need for a change. This kind of happened around the Iron Fist album. We had stopped working well together so the demise was inevitable..”

== Release ==
It was released to little fanfare and sold poorly according to Lemmy. It was reissued in various countries in the eighties; but since then it is only available on the Bronze Records compilation album No Remorse, of 1984, remastered reissue by Sanctuary Records in 2005, as part of the deluxe edition remastered series they did.

== Reception ==
Professional ratings
Review scores
Source	Rating
AllMusic	2/5 stars

One reviewer commented that although "Lemmy has always said that the late Wendy O’Williams was a wonderful person, this doesn’t alter the fact that "Stand By Your Man" is a truly horrible track".

== Track listing ==
No.	Title	Writer(s)	Players(s)	Length
1.	"Stand by Your Man"	Tammy Wynette, Billy Sherrill	Lemmy, Wendy, Richie, Wes, Phil	3:06
2.	"No Class"	Kilmister, Clarke, Taylor	Lemmy, Wendy, Richie, Wes, Phil	2:32
3.	"Masterplan"	Rod Swenson, Richie Stotts	Lemmy, Richie, Wes, Phil	2:55

== Personnel ==
- Lemmy Kilmister – lead vocals on "Stand by Your Man" & "Masterplan", bass guitar
- Phil "Philthy Animal" Taylor – drums
- Wendy O. Williams – lead vocals on "Stand by Your Man" & "No Class"
- Richie Stotts – lead guitar
- Wes Beech – rhythm guitar

== Production ==
- Producer, engineer & mixing - "Fast" Eddie Clarke & Will "Evil Red Neck" Reid
- Engineer - Michael Frondelli
