= What's Words Worth? =

Live album by Motörhead
- Released: February 1983
- Recorded: 18 February 1978
- Venue: The Roundhouse, London, England
- Genre: Rock and roll; heavy metal
- Length: 35:24
- Label: Big Beat Records
- Producer: Duncan Cowell

Motörhead chronology
Stand by Your Man (EP) (1982)	What's Words Worth? (1983)	Another Perfect Day (1983)

What's Words Worth? is the second live album by the band Motörhead, recorded on 18 February 1978, but not released until 1983 on Big Beat Records, some five years later. It is a collection of songs they played in the mid-late 70s; pretty much none of this material appeared in their live set after the early-mid 80s.

== Background ==
Wilko Johnson organised a charity event on 18 February 1978, at The Roundhouse in London, to raise money for the preservation of William Wordsworth manuscripts. Motörhead & Chiswick Records labelmates proto punk R&B garage band The Count Bishops plus Wilko Johnson were on the bill, but for contractual reasons Motörhead needed to perform under the name Iron Fist and the Hordes from Hell, part of which would later be used for the name of a studio album, Iron Fist. During this performance, Pink Fairies' Mick Farren joined them on-stage for a rendition of "Lost Johnny", which wasn't included in the album and still hasn't been released. The Rolling Stones Mobile Studio had been hired to record the 'Bishops live for an upcoming LP, and Motörhead manager at the time Tony Secunda asked if they could record his band also. Following issues with Secunda shortly after this gig, the band changed managers back to Doug Smith, though Secunda had been given a copy of the concert after the show. Secunda left England and returned to the USA not long after this, but the master tape had been kept by Chiswick. As money was always an issue with the band in these days, Smith remembered the tapes and a deal was done to release the recordings (partly) in 1983. As Ted Carroll states in the liner notes:

"..this may not be the greatest live album ever recorded: it is not even the greatest live Motörhead album ever....the album stands as a testament to a band that had the balls to keep on keeping on..".

Lemmy is heard at the end of the concert to say "read plenty of Wordsworth" and as a result the album got its title because of this.

== Release ==
Chiswick Records boss Ted Carroll organised the Rolling Stones mobile truck to record the event, and later released the album through his Big Beat Records label in 1983 (NED 2). Since then it has been re-released with other titles and/or other sleeves, among others as "The Watcher" in Canada, "City Kids," "Live, Loud and Lewd" and "Iron Fist and the Hordes from Hell." In 2017, this concert was re-released on 3-LP box set of Motörhead's debut album, specially for Record Store Day.

== Reception ==
Professional ratings
Review scores
Source	Rating
AllMusic	2/5 stars
The Encyclopedia of Popular Music	3/5 stars

Malcolm Dome of Kerrang! said, "Unfortunately, this is an abysmal embarrassment that really deserved to stay buried. The sound is threadbare, the mix is tinny and rusty, and the whole project has distinct overtones of throw out a cheapo live effort just to make some easy cash.".

== Track listing ==
Side one
No.	Title	Writer(s)	Original Release	Length
1.	"The Watcher"	Ian Fraser Kilmister	1977 ~ Motörhead	4:01
2.	"Iron Horse / Born to Lose"	Phil Taylor, Derek Brown, Guy Lawrence	1977 ~ Motörhead	4:55
3.	"On Parole"	Larry Wallis	1980 ~ Beer Drinkers and Hell Raisers	5:12
4.	"White Line Fever"	Kilmister, Eddie Clarke, Taylor	1977 ~ Motörhead	2:33

Side two
No.	Title	Writer(s)	Original Release	Length
5.	"Keep Us on the Road"	Kilmister, Clarke, Taylor, Mick Farren	1977 ~ Motörhead	5:25
6.	"Leaving Here"	Lamont Dozier, Brian Holland, Edward Holland	1977 ~ Leaving Here / White Line Fever	3:12
7.	"I'm Your Witchdoctor"	John Mayall	1980 ~ Beer Drinkers and Hell Raisers	3:08
8.	"Train Kept A-Rollin'"	Tiny Bradshaw, Howard Kay, Lois Mann	1977 ~ Motörhead	2:43
9.	"City Kids"	Wallis, Duncan Sanderson	1977 ~ Motörhead (Single)	3:43

== Personnel ==
- Lemmy Kilmister – lead vocals, bass
- "Fast" Eddie Clarke – guitar, backing vocals
- Phil "Philthy Animal" Taylor – drums

== Production ==
- Production & Mastering – Duncan Cowell at Sound Mastering Ltd

== Charts ==
Chart (1983)	Peak position
UK Albums (OCC)	71
