= No Sleep 'til Hammersmith =

Live album by Motörhead
- Released: June 1981
- Recorded: (7 February – 20 April) 1980; 28–30 March 1981
- Venues: Unspecified location (Winter/Spring 1980); Queen's Hall (Leeds, England – 28 March 1981); City Hall (Newcastle, England – 29 & 30 March 1981)
- Genres: Heavy metal; hard rock
- Length: 40:31
- Label: Bronze
- Producer: Vic Maile

Motörhead chronology
| St. Valentine's Day Massacre (EP) (1981) | No Sleep 'til Hammersmith (1981) | Iron Fist (1982) |

CD reissue

Singles from No Sleep 'til Hammersmith
- 1. "Motorhead (live)" Released: July 1981

No Sleep 'til Hammersmith is the first live album by English rock band Motörhead, released in June 1981 by Bronze Records. It peaked at number one on the UK Albums Chart. It was followed by the release of the single "Motorhead" (backed with the non-album track "Over the Top") on 3 July, which peaked on the UK Singles Chart at number 6.

== Background ==
After releasing three albums and touring for five years, Motörhead's 1980 album Ace of Spades (their first LP to be released in the United States) gave the band its first taste of major success. However, as drummer Phil "Philthy Animal" Taylor wryly notes in the documentary The Guts and the Glory:

The more famous we seemed to get, the more we were working all the time, and we just never seemed to see any money... this is how you know you're being ripped off, when they work you like dogs and hardly give you any time off, 'cause when you got a bit of time off you might start thinking about things.

— Phil Taylor

In February 1981, the band released the St. Valentine's Day Massacre EP co-recorded with Girlschool, and in March headed out on a British jaunt called the "Short Sharp Pain in the Neck" tour, from which the songs on No Sleep 'til Hammersmith would be picked.

== Recording ==
The original No Sleep 'Til Hammersmith LP includes two songs from their debut album, the title track from 1979's Bomber, five songs from 1979's Overkill, and three songs from Ace of Spades. The track "Motorhead" would be released as a single and become the band's biggest chart hit, reaching number 6 in the UK. Bar "Iron Horse/Born to Lose", which was from a 1980 show, No Sleep 'til Hammersmith was recorded at Leeds and Newcastle shows during the Short Sharp Pain in the Neck tour. The name of the tour referred to an injury sustained by Taylor when he was dropped on his head during after-show horseplay.

The title is a reference to the major London music venue the Hammersmith Odeon (now Apollo); often the last stop on the band's UK tours. But despite the name, this venue was not played on this tour, the shows being:

- 27 March 1981: West Runton Pavilion, Norfolk, England
- 28 March 1981: Queen's Hall, Leeds, England
- 29 March 1981: City Hall, Newcastle, England
- 30 March 1981: City Hall, Newcastle, England
- 3 April 1981: Maysfield Leisure Centre, Belfast, Northern Ireland

Backstage at Leeds and Newcastle, the band were presented with silver and gold records for sales of Ace of Spades, silver for Overkill and silver for "Please Don't Touch". The sound at Leeds Queens hall was not good and most of the original album is taken from Newcastle. Vocalist and bassist Lemmy stated that originally they intended No Sleep 'til Hammersmith to be a double album but they only had enough material for three sides.

It still sounds good to me… We were in the middle of a 53-show tour, so by that time we were on automatic. We were tight, and you can hear that on the record… There are mistakes on there. There are always mistakes on a live album… that's life. Life ain't perfect, and I'm no different. I think I overdubbed a couple of lines of vocals on Hammersmith, but there's no false songs.

— Lemmy

At the time of the album's release, the band were in the middle of their first tour of North America, supporting Ozzy Osbourne. "When 'No Sleep 'Til Hammersmith' came out", Lemmy told James McNair of Mojo in 2011, "it made a difference financially, but a lot of it went back into the show."

== Reception ==
Professional ratings
Review scores
| Source | Rating |
|---|---|
| AllMusic | 4.5/5 stars |
| Robert Christgau | B+ |
| Collector's Guide to Heavy Metal | 7/10 |
| The Encyclopedia of Popular Music | 4/5 stars |
| The Great Rock Discography | 8/10 |
| Spin Alternative Record Guide | 10/10 |

No Sleep 'til Hammersmith is the band's peak in terms of chart positions. In the wake of the success of the St. Valentine's Day Massacre EP and Ace of Spades album and single, it entered the UK chart at number one. Lemmy believed its success was due to a building anticipation from their fan base for a live album, due to the band having toured so heavily in the past, but also considered it their "downfall" due to the difficulty in following up its success.

I was asleep in New York… Our manager rang me up and I said, "Fuck it, I'm asleep, call me later." A couple of minutes later, it [the number one] registered and I was bolt upright. We were doing well. Little did we know that the fucking damaged floorboard was just around the corner.

— Lemmy

Jason Birchmeier of AllMusic wrote, "the performance: in a word, it's breakneck. [...] Motörhead could do no wrong at this point in time, as they were laying the foundation for the coming thrash movement, in a way, and their winning streak continues here on No Sleep 'Til Hammersmith, one of the best live metal albums of all time." In the 2011 book Overkill: The Untold Story of Motörhead, biographer Joel McIver calls it "the peak of the Lemmy/Clarke/Philthy line-up's career". Robert Christgau wrote, "Vic Maile's power-packed definition obliterates my bias against live recording. Remakes of white lies like 'No Class' and 'Stay Clean' and calling cards like 'Bomber' and 'Motorhead' save valuable shelf space. So what if it gives me a headache? Sometimes a headache comes as a relief."

The Daily Telegraph rated it the best live album of all time. It is also featured in the book 1001 Albums You Must Hear Before You Die.

== Legacy ==
The title of the band's third live album, Nö Sleep at All, refers to the title of this album.

The album title was also referenced by the Beastie Boys on the track "No Sleep till Brooklyn" from their album Licensed to Ill.

== Track listing ==
=== Original edition ===
Side A
| No. | Title | Original studio release | Length |
|---|---|---|---|
| 1. | "Ace of Spades" (30 March 1981) | 1980 ~ Ace of Spades | 3:01 |
| 2. | "Stay Clean" (30 March 1981) | 1979 ~ Overkill | 2:50 |
| 3. | "Metropolis" (30 March 1981) | 1979 ~ Overkill | 3:31 |
| 4. | "The Hammer" (29 March 1981) | 1980 ~ Ace of Spades | 3:05 |
| 5. | "Iron Horse/Born to Lose" (1980) (unknown date) | 1977 ~ Motörhead | 3:58 |
| 6. | "No Class" (28 March 1981) | 1979 ~ Overkill | 2:34 |

Side B
| No. | Title | Original studio release | Length |
|---|---|---|---|
| 7. | "Overkill" (30 March 1981) | 1979 ~ Overkill | 5:13 |
| 8. | "(We Are) The Road Crew" (30 March 1981) | 1980 ~ Ace of Spades | 3:31 |
| 9. | "Capricorn" (30 March 1981) | 1979 ~ Overkill | 4:40 |
| 10. | "Bomber" (28 March 1981) | 1979 ~ Bomber | 3:24 |
| 11. | "Motörhead" (29 March 1981) | 1977 ~ Motörhead | 4:47 |
| Total length: | | | 40:31 |

Castle Communications 1996 CD reissue bonus tracks
| No. | Title | Original studio release | Length |
|---|---|---|---|
| 12. | "Over the Top" (30 March 1981) | 1979 ~ Bomber (single) | 3:04 |
| 13. | "Capricorn" (alternative version) | 1979 ~ Overkill | 4:54 |
| 14. | "Train Kept A-Rollin'" (1980) (unknown date) | 1977 ~ Motörhead | 2:44 |

=== Metal-Is Records 2001 2-CD re-issue edition ===
Disc 1 bonus tracks
| No. | Title | Original studio release | Length |
|---|---|---|---|
| 12. | "Over the Top" (30 March 1981) | 1979 ~ Bomber (single) | 2:57 |
| 13. | "Shoot You in the Back" (30 March 1981) | 1980 ~ Ace of Spades | 2:43 |
| 14. | "Jailbait" (28 March 1981) | 1980 ~ Ace of Spades | 3:34 |
| 15. | "Leaving Here" (28 March 1981) | 1977 ~ Leaving Here / White Line Fever | 2:48 |
| 16. | "Fire, Fire" (29 March 1981) | 1980 ~ Ace of Spades | 2:55 |
| 17. | "Too Late, Too Late" (30 March 1981) | 1979 ~ Overkill (single) | 3:04 |
| 18. | "Bite the Bullet / The Chase Is Better Than the Catch" (30 March 1981) | 1980 ~ Ace of Spades | 6:38 |

Disc 2
| No. | Title | Original studio release | Length |
|---|---|---|---|
| 1. | "Ace of Spades" (28 March 1981) | 1980 ~ Ace of Spades | 2:47 |
| 2. | "Stay Clean" (29 March 1981) | 1979 ~ Overkill | 2:54 |
| 3. | "Metropolis" (29 March 1981) | 1979 ~ Overkill | 3:46 |
| 4. | "The Hammer" (28 March 1981) | 1980 ~ Ace of Spades | 3:01 |
| 5. | "Capricorn" (29 March 1981) | 1979 ~ Overkill | 5:00 |
| 6. | "No Class" (29 March 1981) | 1979 ~ Overkill | 5:00 |
| 7. | "(We Are) The Road Crew" (28 March 1981) | 1980 ~ Ace of Spades | 3:31 |
| 8. | "Bite the Bullet / The Chase Is Better Than the Catch" (28 March 1981) | 1980 ~ Ace of Spades | 6:07 |
| 9. | "Overkill" (29 March 1981) | 1979 ~ Overkill | 4:53 |
| 10. | "Bomber" (29 March 1981) | 1979 ~ Bomber | 3:26 |
| 11. | "Motörhead" (30 March 1981) | 1977 ~ Motörhead | 5:31 |

- All track dates taken from the liner notes
- 'Iron Horse/Born to Lose' was recorded at an unspecified location in 1980, on the 1980 European tour (thus between 7 February and 20 April 1980), the same tour as The Golden Years EP, which are also unspecified on any releases.

=== 2021 40th anniversary edition ===
No Sleep 'til Hammersmith was reissued on 25 June 2021 via Sanctuary/BMG for its 40th anniversary across a number of formats, including a four-CD deluxe edition with previously unreleased performances. The record featured tracks from the band’s Short Sharp Pain in the Neck tour which saw them play Newcastle, Leeds, Norfolk and Belfast in the space of a week, in late March / early April 1981. This 40th anniversary reissue features a new remaster of the original album created from the original tapes. The four-CD edition includes five bonus tracks on the first disc (three of which are previously unreleased from a soundcheck) and features three previously unreleased full concerts from this tour: Leeds Queen Hall (28 March 1981) and both nights from Newcastle City Hall (29 & 30 March 1981). Just over half of the original album is from the Newcastle show on the 30 March. The box set includes 28-page book, poster, plectrum, tour pass, ticket, flyer & badge.

CD 1: Original album remastered 2021 (including five bonus tracks)
| No. | Title | Original studio release | Length |
|---|---|---|---|
| 1. | "Ace of Spades" (30 March 1981) | 1980 ~ Ace of Spades | 3:01 |
| 2. | "Stay Clean" (30 March 1981) | 1979 ~ Overkill | 2:50 |
| 3. | "Metropolis" (30 March 1981) | 1979 ~ Overkill | 3:31 |
| 4. | "The Hammer" (29 March 1981) | 1980 ~ Ace of Spades | 3:05 |
| 5. | "Iron Horse/Born to Lose" (1980) (unknown date) | 1977 ~ Motörhead | 3:58 |
| 6. | "No Class" (28 March 1981) | 1979 ~ Overkill | 2:34 |
| 7. | "Overkill" (30 March 1981) | 1979 ~ Overkill | 5:13 |
| 8. | "(We Are) The Road Crew" (30 March 1981) | 1980 ~ Ace of Spades | 3:31 |
| 9. | "Capricorn" (30 March 1981) | 1979 ~ Overkill | 4:40 |
| 10. | "Bomber" (28 March 1981) | 1979 ~ Bomber | 3:24 |
| 11. | "Motörhead" (29 March 1981) | 1977 ~ Motörhead | 4:47 |

Bonus tracks (previously released as two of the three Castle Communications 1996 CD reissue bonus tracks)
| No. | Title | Original studio (or live) release | Length |
|---|---|---|---|
| 12. | "Over the Top" (30 March 1981) | 1979 ~ Bomber (single) | 3:04 |
| 13. | "Train Kept A-Rollin'" (1980) (unknown date) | 1977 ~ Motörhead | 2:44 |

Bonus tracks (Live Soundcheck at Newcastle City Hall – March 30, 1981) (previously unreleased)
| No. | Title | Original studio (or live) release | Length |
|---|---|---|---|
| 14. | "Stay Clean" | 1979 ~ Overkill |
| 15. | "Limb From Limb" | 1979 ~ Overkill |
| 16. | "Iron Horse" | 1977 ~ Motörhead |

CD 2: Live at Newcastle City Hall – March 30, 1981 (only 7 tracks previously unreleased)
| No. | Title | Original studio release | Length |
|---|---|---|---|
| 1. | "Ace of Spades" (previously released) | 1980 ~ Ace of Spades |
| 2. | "Stay Clean" (previously released) | 1979 ~ Overkill |
| 3. | "Over the Top" (previously released) | 1979 ~ Bomber (single) |
| 4. | "Metropolis" (previously released) | 1979 ~ Overkill |
| 5. | "Shoot You In The Back" (previously released) | 1980 ~ Ace of Spades |
| 6. | "The Hammer" | 1980 ~ Ace of Spades |
| 7. | "Jailbait" | 1980 ~ Ace of Spades |
| 8. | "Leaving Here" | 1977 ~ Leaving Here (debut) single |
| 9. | "Iron Horse/Born to Lose" | 1977 ~ Motörhead |
| 10. | "Fire Fire" | 1980 ~ Ace of Spades |
| 11. | "Capricorn" (previously released) | 1979 ~ Overkill |
| 12. | "Too Late Too Late" (previously released) | 1979 ~ Overkill single |
| 13. | "No Class" | 1979 ~ Overkill |
| 14. | "(We Are) The Road Crew" (previously released) | 1980 ~ Ace of Spades |
| 15. | "Bite The Bullet" (previously released) | 1980 ~ Ace of Spades |
| 16. | "The Chase Is Better Than The Catch" (previously released) | 1980 ~ Ace of Spades |
| 17. | "Overkill" (previously released) | 1979 ~ Overkill |
| 18. | "Bomber" | 1979 ~ Bomber |
| 19. | "Motörhead" (previously released) | 1977 ~ Motörhead |

CD 3: Live at Newcastle City Hall – March 29, 1981 (half of the show previously unreleased)
| No. | Title | Original studio release | Length |
|---|---|---|---|
| 1. | "Ace of Spades" | 1980 ~ Ace of Spades |
| 2. | "Stay Clean" (previously released) | 1979 ~ Overkill |
| 3. | "Over the Top" | 1979 ~ Bomber (single) |
| 4. | "Metropolis" (previously released) | 1979 ~ Overkill |
| 5. | "Shoot You In The Back" | 1980 ~ Ace of Spades |
| 6. | "The Hammer" (previously released) | 1980 ~ Ace of Spades |
| 7. | "Jailbait" | 1980 ~ Ace of Spades |
| 8. | "Leaving Here" | 1977 ~ Leaving Here (debut) single |
| 9. | "Fire Fire" (previously released) | 1980 ~ Ace of Spades |
| 10. | "Capricorn" (previously released) | 1979 ~ Overkill |
| 11. | "Too Late Too Late" | 1979 ~ Overkill single |
| 12. | "No Class" (previously released) | 1979 ~ Overkill |
| 13. | "(We Are) The Road Crew" | 1980 ~ Ace of Spades |
| 14. | "Bite The Bullet" | 1980 ~ Ace of Spades |
| 15. | "The Chase Is Better Than The Catch" | 1980 ~ Ace of Spades |
| 16. | "Overkill" (previously released) | 1979 ~ Overkill |
| 17. | "Bomber" (previously released) | 1979 ~ Bomber |
| 18. | "Motörhead" (previously released) | 1977 ~ Motörhead |

CD 4: Live at Leeds Queen's Hall – March 28, 1981 (half of the show previously unreleased)
| No. | Title | Original studio release | Length |
|---|---|---|---|
| 1. | "Ace of Spades" (previously released) | 1980 ~ Ace of Spades |
| 2. | "Stay Clean" | 1979 ~ Overkill |
| 3. | "Over the Top" | 1979 ~ Bomber (single) |
| 4. | "Metropolis" | 1979 ~ Overkill |
| 5. | "Shoot You In The Back" | 1980 ~ Ace of Spades |
| 6. | "The Hammer" (previously released) | 1980 ~ Ace of Spades |
| 7. | "Jailbait" (previously released) | 1980 ~ Ace of Spades |
| 8. | "Leaving Here" (previously released) | 1977 ~ Leaving Here (debut) single |
| 9. | "Fire Fire" | 1980 ~ Ace of Spades |
| 10. | "Capricorn" | 1979 ~ Overkill |
| 11. | "Too Late Too Late" | 1979 ~ Overkill single |
| 12. | "No Class" (previously released) | 1979 ~ Overkill |
| 13. | "(We Are) The Road Crew" (previously released) | 1980 ~ Ace of Spades |
| 14. | "Bite The Bullet" (previously released) | 1980 ~ Ace of Spades |
| 15. | "The Chase Is Better Than The Catch" (previously released) | 1980 ~ Ace of Spades |
| 16. | "Overkill" | 1979 ~ Overkill |
| 17. | "Bomber" (previously released) | 1979 ~ Bomber |
| 18. | "Motörhead" | 1977 ~ Motörhead |

== Personnel ==
Per the album's liner notes.

- Ian "Lemmy" Kilmister – lead vocals, bass
- "Fast" Eddie Clarke – guitar, backing vocals
- Phil "Philthy Animal" Taylor – drums

=== Production ===
- Vic Maile – producer
- Ian Kalinowski – front sleeve photography
- Graham Mitchell – back sleeve photography
- Simon Porter – back sleeve photography

== Release history ==
| Date | Region | Label | Catalogue | Format | Notes |
|---|---|---|---|---|---|
| June 1981 | UK | Bronze | BRON 535 | vinyl | Peaked at number 1 in the album chart. Has a photo-montage inner-sleeve. |
| June 1981 | UK | Bronze | BRONG 535 | gold vinyl | |
| 1990 | UK | Castle | CLACD 179 | CD | |
| 1996 | UK | Essential | ESMCD313 | CD | 3 bonus tracks, gold picture disc |
| 1996 | North America | Dojo | DOJO 3035-2 | CD | 3 bonus tracks |
| 2001 | UK | Sanctuary | SMEDD 043 | 2CD | "Complete Edition": bonus unreleased tracks (disk 1) and alternate takes (disk 2) |

== Charts ==
=== Weekly charts ===
Chart performance for No Sleep 'til Hammersmith
| Chart (1981–1982) | Peak position |
|---|---|
| Finnish Albums (The Official Finnish Charts) | 5 |
| German Albums (Offizielle Top 100) | 12 |
| New Zealand Albums (RMNZ) | 28 |
| Norwegian Albums (VG-lista) | 24 |
| Swedish Albums (Sverigetopplistan) | 27 |
| Swiss Albums (Schweizer Hitparade) | 28 |
| UK Albums (Official Charts) | 1 |

| Chart (2021) | Peak position |
|---|---|
| Belgian Albums (Ultratop Flanders) | 128 |
| Belgian Albums (Ultratop Wallonia) | 41 |
| Finnish Albums (Suomen virallinen lista) | 29 |
| German Albums (Offizielle Top 100) | 4 |
| Scottish Albums (Official Charts) | 5 |
| Spanish Albums (Promusicae) | 40 |
| UK Independent Albums (Official Charts) | 4 |
| UK Rock & Metal Albums (Official Charts) | 2 |

=== Year-end charts ===
| Chart (1981) | Position |
|---|---|
| German Albums (Offizielle Top 100) | 52 |

== Certifications ==
| Region | Certification | Certified units/sales |
|---|---|---|
| United Kingdom (BPI) | Gold | 100,000^{^} |
^{^} Shipments figures based on certification alone.
