= Iron Fist (album) =

Studio album by Motörhead
- Released: April 1982
- Recorded: 26 January–28 February 1982
- Studios: Ramport, London; Morgan, London
- Genres: Heavy metal; hard rock; speed metal
- Length: 36:24
- Label: Bronze
- Producers: Will Reid Dick, Eddie Clarke

Motörhead chronology
No Sleep 'til Hammersmith (1981)	Iron Fist (1982)	Stand by Your Man (EP) (1982)

CD reissue

Singles from Iron Fist
- 1. "Iron Fist" Released: March 1982; 2. "Go to Hell" Released: April 1982 (Germany)

Iron Fist is the fifth studio album by English rock band Motörhead, released in April 1982 by Bronze Records. It was the final album of the classic Three Amigos lineup of Lemmy Kilmister, "Fast" Eddie Clarke, and Phil "Philthy Animal" Taylor. The album peaked at No. 6 on the UK album charts. It was preceded by the release of the title track "Iron Fist" as a single, which entered the UK charts on 3 April, and peaked at No. 29.

== Recording ==
As with 1980's Ace of Spades, recording commenced with producer Vic Maile at his Jackson's Studio in Rickmansworth in 1981. Motorhead was enjoying their greatest commercial success at the time, having had their live album No Sleep 'til Hammersmith debut at No. 1 on the UK charts. A break in recording for the band to play some November and December dates with Algy Ward's Tank was followed by Clarke producing Tank's debut album with help from Will Reid Dick. Soon after, Maile left the Motörhead project, and there are conflicting explanations as to why. One is that Clarke was unhappy with the Maile produced sessions and decided that the album should be recorded themselves, although Lemmy lamented at the time that:

"It's a shame to have lost Vic in a way because I thought it was successful."

However, in the Motörhead documentary The Guts and the Glory, Clarke insists that drummer Phil "Philthy Animal" Taylor refused to work with the producer after Maile got him an unsatisfactory drum sound, stating:

"[...] and then one day Phil turned to me and said, 'Listen Eddie, why don't you do it?' And I said, 'Man, I don't wanna do it, I'm playing on the record'... I swear to God, I was reluctant as fuck."

In the same film Lemmy states:

"I was pissed off 'cause we let Eddie produce it. I wasn't at the time, though. Fair play. But it became obvious after it was released – I sort of sobered up and realized it was garbage, most of it. And there's at least three songs on there that weren't even finished. We just finished them in the studio, you know, like cobbled it together. It just was a substandard album. But the trouble is how do you follow a live album that went straight in at #1? There's nothing you can do."

The album was recorded during the best part of late January and February 1982 at Morgan Studios and Ramport Studios in London, with Clarke producing and Dick engineering. Clarke said the recording:

"[...] pissed me off a lot. I ended up having to produce it because we fell out with Maile and couldn't find a replacement. Lemmy wasn't really together enough either."

Struggling to think of a name for the title track for the album, Lemmy remembered the time the band had performed live under the name Iron Fist and the Hordes from Hell for contractual reasons (a subsequent album What's Words Worth? was released of that event), and decided this was an apt name for this project. The name was eventually shortened to simply Iron Fist.

== Release ==
A promotional film was made of the band dressed in studded leather armour and wielding broadswords, described by Lemmy as "all dressed up as idiots, prancing about in a wood in South Mimms as opposed to prancing about in South Mimms dressed as cowboy idiots", with Clarke adding that they looked "like a bunch of fairies prancing about with armour on... It's very hard not to." The band undertook a UK tour from 17 March to 12 April with support from Tank. This was to be the first tour to drop the bomber lighting rig, with Lemmy feeling that they had "to do something new sooner or later" despite it being "the best show I've ever seen in my life". The rig was replaced by a gigantic iron fist that was supposed to unfold its hand but, as Lemmy explained to Uncut's John Robinson in 2015, it malfunctioned and made a "rude gesture" to the crowd. The band continued touring to promote the album, visiting North America in May and June, Japan at the end of June, and, after some summer festival appearances, mainland Europe in October and November.

The first date of the North American tour, 12 May at C.N.E. Coliseum (now Ricoh Coliseum) in Toronto, was filmed and subsequently released on video as Live in Toronto and later as the bonus disc of the deluxe edition of the CD. In his 2002 autobiography White Line Fever, Lemmy recalls that at the Toronto show:

"Eddie was terrible and so was I - I got cramp halfway through the show and couldn't play."

Promotion for the album went as far as the May 1982 edition of Rennbahn Express, an Austrian magazine, which included a free flexidisc with excerpts from "Iron Fist", "Sex and Outrage", "Don't Let 'em Grind You Down", and "Loser". Lemmy is interviewed by Robert Reumann in English and is overdubbed with a German translation. The release of the album prompted Bronze/Mercury in Canada to issue The Complete Motörhead Kit, which featured a limited-edition 12-inch vinyl containing "Iron Fist", "Too Late, Too Late", "Remember Me, I'm Gone", "Ace of Spades" and "Motörhead" (from the No Sleep 'til Hammersmith album), plus a tour programme, a tour poster, and an embroidered patch of the band's logo.

== "Fast" Eddie's departure ==
After the second date on 14 May at New York's Palladium, Clarke left the band, his replacement being former Thin Lizzy guitarist Brian Robertson with the tour recommencing a week later on 21 May in Detroit. Bad feelings between Kilmister and Clarke had been simmering for a while, but the breaking point came when Lemmy decided to record a cover of the Tammy Wynette country classic "Stand By Your Man" with Wendy O. Williams and the Plasmatics. Asked to play on the single, Clarke quit the band. Lemmy reflected on the guitarist's departure in his 2002 memoir:

"Actually, Eddie used to leave the band about every two months, but this time it just so happened that we didn't ask him back. We didn't try to persuade him, which is why he stayed away - that surprised him a bit. But we were just tired of him because he was always freaking out and he was drinking a lot back then. He's become much better now since he stopped... Looking back - and I must say, hindsight is 20/20 - it was good for us that we fell apart when we did. We wouldn't have been going now if we had carried on getting more and more famous. We would have wound up a bunch of twats with houses in the country and gotten divorced from each other. So it was just as well, I think, for Motörhead's morale overall. It's important for a band to be hungry because that is the motivation that makes all bands work. And if anyone knows about being hungry for long periods of time, it's me."

Lemmy reiterated in 2000 that Iron Fist was:

"[...] bad, inferior to anything else we've ever done. Having Eddie produce it was a mistake that even he would now probably admit to... we weren't ready to do another album, I don't care what anybody says."

Clarke maintains in The Guts and the Glory:

"[...] it wasn't so much the album, I think it was the attitude the album was made [with] was what made it not good. For me, whenever I play it, I can feel it's not quite right... The songs would'a been better had we been working as a unit."

== Critical reception ==
Professional ratings
Review scores
Source	Rating
AllMusic	4/5 stars
Collector's Guide to Heavy Metal	8/10
The Encyclopedia of Popular Music	4/5 stars
Rolling Stone	4/5 stars
Spin Alternative Record Guide	2/10

AllMusic enthuses Iron Fist is "a fine Motörhead album, and there's not much at all to complain about here", but concedes "Clarke's production is a bit sterile" while lauding "several standout songs... amid a strong selection overall".

== Track listing ==
=== Standard edition ===
All tracks are written by Lemmy, Eddie Clarke and Phil Taylor

Side one
No.	Title	Length
1.	"Iron Fist"	2:55
2.	"Heart of Stone"	3:04
3.	"I'm the Doctor"	2:43
4.	"Go to Hell"	3:10
5.	"Loser"	3:57
6.	"Sex & Outrage"	2:10

Side two
No.	Title	Length
7.	"America"	3:38
8.	"Shut It Down"	2:41
9.	"Speedfreak"	3:28
10.	"(Don't Let 'Em) Grind Ya Down"	3:08
11.	"(Don't Need) Religion"	2:43
12.	"Bang to Rights"	2:43
Total length:		36:24

=== Castle Communications 1996 CD reissue bonus tracks ===
No.	Title	Original release	Length
13.	"Remember Me, I'm Gone"	1982 ~ Iron Fist (Single)	2:18
14.	"(Don't Let 'Em) Grind Ya Down" (Alternative Version)		3:09
15.	"Lemmy Goes to the Pub" (Alternative Take of Heart of Stone)		3:02
16.	"Same Old Song, I'm Gone" (Alternate Take of Remember Me, I'm Gone)		2:20
17.	"Young and Crazy" (Instrumental Take of Sex & Outrage)		2:12

=== Sanctuary Records 2005 2-CD deluxe edition ===
Disc one includes the original album without bonus tracks. Track B1 is the B-side of the "Iron Fist" single.
Tracks B2–B15 is the band's performance at the Maple Leaf Gardens, Toronto, Canada, on 12 May 1982. This is an error as it was the CNE Coliseum.

All tracks are written by Kilmister, Clarke, Taylor.

Disc 2
No.	Title	Original release	Length
1.	"Remember Me, I'm Gone"	1982 ~ Iron Fist (Single)	2:19

Live at Toronto
No.	Title	Original release	Length
2.	"Overkill"	1979 ~ Overkill	2:52
3.	"Heart of Stone"	1982 ~ Iron Fist	3:07
4.	"Shoot You in the Back"	1980 ~ Ace of Spades	3:10
5.	"The Hammer"	1980 ~ Ace of Spades	3:19
6.	"Jailbait"	1980 ~ Ace of Spades	3:56
7.	"America"	1982 ~ Iron Fist	3:23
8.	"(Don't Need) Religion"	1982 ~ Iron Fist	3:20
9.	"Capricorn"	1979 ~ Overkill	4:23
10.	"(Don't Let 'Em) Grind You Down"	1982 ~ Iron Fist	3:24
11.	"(We Are) The Road Crew"	1980 ~ Ace of Spades	3:08
12.	"No Class"	1979 ~ Overkill	2:32
13.	"Bite the Bullet"	1980 ~ Ace of Spades	1:30
14.	"The Chase Is Better Than the Catch"	1980 ~ Ace of Spades	5:13
15.	"Bomber"	1979 ~ Bomber	4:53

- There is discrepancy about the live recording location, as the original VHS of the show says the "C.N.E. Colosseum, Toronto" and the 2005 deluxe booklet says "Maple Leaf Gardens, Toronto". It was in fact the CNE Coliseum - note the correct spelling.

=== 40th Anniversary Edition (23 September 2022) ===
Disc 1 – LP & CD editions Bonus Tracks – incl. 5 Jackson's Studio Demos – October 1981
No.	Title	Demos or b-side	Length
13.	"Remember Me, I'm Gone"	1982 ~ Iron Fist single B-side
14.	"The Doctor"	Jackson's Studio Demo
15.	"Young & Crazy"	Jackson's Studio Demo (Alternative Version of "Sex & Outrage")
16.	"Loser"	Jackson's Studio Demo
17.	"Iron Fist"	Jackson's Studio Demo
18.	"Go to Hell"	Jackson's Studio Demo

Disc 1 – CD & Digital editions Bonus Tracks – incl. 4 Jackson's Studio Demos – October 1981
No.	Title	Demos or alternate versions	Length
19.	"Lemmy Goes to the Pub"	Alternate version of "Heart of Stone"
20.	"Some Old Song, I'm Gone"	Alternate version of "Remember Me, I'm Gone"
21.	"(Don't Let 'Em) Grind Ya Down (Alternate Version)"	Alternate version
22.	"Shut It Down"	Jackson's Studio Demo
23.	"Sponge Cake (Instrumental)"	Jackson's Studio Demo
24.	"Ripsaw Teardown (Instrumental)"	Jackson's Studio Demo
25.	"Peter Gunn (Instrumental)"	Jackson's Studio Demo

Disc 2 – Live at Glasgow Apollo – 18 March 1982 (Previously unreleased)
No.	Title	Length
1.	"Iron Fist"
2.	"Heart of Stone"
3.	"Shoot You in the Back"
4.	"The Hammer"
5.	"Loser"
6.	"Jailbait"
7.	"America"
8.	"White Line"
9.	"(Don't Need) Religion"
10.	"Go to Hell"
11.	"Capricorn"
12.	"(Don't Let 'Em) Grind Ya Down"
13.	"(We Are the) Road Crew"
14.	"Ace of Spades"
15.	"Bite the Bullet"
16.	"The Chase Is Better Than the Catch"
17.	"Overkill"
18.	"Bomber"
19.	"Motörhead"

== Personnel ==
Per the album's liner notes.

- Lemmy – vocals, bass guitar
- "Fast" Eddie Clarke – guitars
- Phil "Philthy Animal" Taylor – drums

Production

- Will "Evil Red Neck" Reid – producer
- "Fast" Eddie Clarke – producer
- Charles Harrowell – engineer
- Chaz Harrowell – mixing
- Martin Poole – album design
- Alan Ballard – photography
- Joe Petagno – Snaggletooth

2005 deluxe edition remaster

- Giovanni Scatola – mastering
- Steve Hammonds – release coordination
- Jon Richards – release coordination
- Malcolm Dome – sleeve notes
- Mick Stevenson – project consultant, photos and archive memorabilia
- Curt Evans – 2005 cover design

== Charts ==
1982 chart performance for Iron Fist
Chart (1982)	Peak position
Australian Albums (Kent Music Report)	80
Dutch Albums (Album Top 100)	26
Finnish Albums (The Official Finnish Charts)	5
German Albums (Offizielle Top 100)	27
New Zealand Albums (RMNZ)	23
Norwegian Albums (VG-lista)	4
Swedish Albums (Sverigetopplistan)	25
UK Albums (Official Charts)	6
US Billboard 200	174

2022 chart performance for Iron Fist
Chart (2022)	Peak position
Austrian Albums (Ö3 Austria)	75
Belgian Albums (Ultratop Flanders)	145
Belgian Albums (Ultratop Wallonia)	191
German Albums (Offizielle Top 100)	15
Scottish Albums (Official Charts)	11
Spanish Albums (Promusicae)	58
Swiss Albums (Schweizer Hitparade)	26
UK Independent Albums (Official Charts)	9

== Certifications ==
Region	Certification	Certified units/sales
United Kingdom (BPI)	Silver	60,000^{^}
^{^} Shipments figures based on certification alone.

== Release history ==
Date	Region	Label	Catalogue	Format	Notes
April 1982	UK	Bronze	BRON 539	vinyl	
April 14, 1982	US	Mercury	SRM-1-4042	vinyl	
1982	France	WEA Filipacchi Music	893048	vinyl	
1982	Germany	Bronze	204 636	vinyl	
21 December 1982	Yugoslavia	Jugoton	LSBRO 11019	vinyl	
1982	Australia/NZ	Bronze	L-37841	vinyl	
1982	Brazil	Bronze	6328444	vinyl	
1987	France	Castle Communications	CLACD 123	CD	
1996	UK	Essential, Castle Music	ESM CD 372	CD	with 5 bonus tracks
1999	US	Castle Music America	CDX CMACD-523	CD	with 5 bonus tracks
2001	North America	Metal-Is	CDX 85211	CD	with 5 bonus tracks
2003	Italy	Earmark	LPPIC 41017	180g vinyl picture disc, gatefold cover	
2005	UK	Sanctuary	SMED-244	2CD	with bonus disc
