= We Are Motörhead =

Studio album by Motörhead
- Released: 15 May 2000
- Recorded: June–August 1999; December 1999 – March 2000
- Studio: Karo Studios (Brackel, Germany); American Recorders (Calabasas, California)
- Genre: Heavy metal
- Length: 38:20
- Label: SPV/Steamhammer; CMC
- Producer: Motörhead, Bob Kulick, Bruce Bouillet, Duane Baron

Motörhead chronology
Everything Louder than Everyone Else (1999)	We Are Motörhead (2000)	Deaf Forever: The Best of Motörhead (2000)

Singles from We Are Motörhead
- 1. "God Save the Queen" Released: 2000; 2. "We Are Motörhead" Released: 2000

We Are Motörhead is the fifteenth studio album by British rock band Motörhead. It was released on 15 May 2000 via Steamhammer, their fifth with the label, equalling their Bronze Records total of full length original album releases.

== Recording ==
The album contains a cover of the punk band The Sex Pistols' song "God Save the Queen", for which the band recorded a promo video atop an open-top London AEC Routemaster bus. In the Motörhead documentary The Guts and the Glory, vocalist and bassist Lemmy Kilmister declares:

"I think We Are Motörhead was a much better album than it got credit for."

== Release ==
At the time of We Are Motörhead's release, the band was in competition with itself as the compilations Deaf Forever: The Best of Motörhead and The Best of Motörhead also came out, something the band had no control over.

== Artwork ==
Joe Petagno, the sleeve artist, commented on the influences behind the cover concept:

"It's one of my favourite pieces. At that time, there was a lot of death metal and black metal going on. I was working with a lot of those people anyway. They were all totally Motörhead dedicated, and grew up with Motörhead. I said, "Listen, instead of letting these guys sort of get to you, why don't we just pay homage to the death thing? That's cool enough. You guys were the first to do it anyway". In the original sketch, the head was turned three-quarter view, but Lemmy said we'd never used the head since "Deaf Forever" from the side. So why don't we just give it a full profile?."

== Critical reception ==
Professional ratings
Review scores
Source	Rating
AllMusic	3/5 stars
The Encyclopedia of Popular Music	2/5 stars
Kerrang!	3/5 stars
Rock Hard	8.0/10

AllMusic review states:

"'We Are Motörhead' maintains the generally high standard of the band's second decade, and while there aren't many speed-freak theatrics...the grimy attitude that's always driven their best work is fully intact. Pared back down to a trio, Kilmister and company deliver a tight, blistering set that's both well-executed and typical of Motörhead's long since established sound."

== Track listing ==
All tracks are written by Lemmy, Phil Campbell and Mikkey Dee except where noted

CD
No.	Title	Writer(s)	Length
1.	"See Me Burning"		2:59
2.	"Slow Dance"		4:29
3.	"Stay Out of Jail"		3:02
4.	"God Save the Queen" (Sex Pistols cover)	Paul Cook, Steve Jones, John Lydon, Glen Matlock	3:19
5.	"Out to Lunch"		3:26
6.	"Wake the Dead"		5:14
7.	"One More Fucking Time"		6:46
8.	"Stagefright/Crash & Burn"		3:02
9.	"(Wearing Your) Heart on Your Sleeve"		3:42
10.	"We Are Motörhead"		2:21
Total length:			38:20

== Personnel ==
Adapted from the album's liner notes.

- Lemmy – lead vocals, bass
- Phil Campbell – lead guitar
- Mikkey Dee – drums

Production

- Bob Kulick, Bruce Bouillet, Duane Baron, Motörhead – producers
- Charlie Bauerfeind, Bill Cooper – engineers
- Steffan Chirazi – design concept
- Mark Ambramson, Zen Jam, Glen La Ferman, Stephanie Cabral, Annamaria DiSanto – design
- G$ – photography
- Joe Petagno – album cover, Snaggletooth

== Charts ==
Chart (2000)	Peak position
Finnish Albums (Suomen virallinen lista)	39
German Albums (Offizielle Top 100)	21
Swedish Albums (Sverigetopplistan)	24
UK Albums (OCC)	91
UK Independent Albums (OCC)	15
UK Rock & Metal Albums (OCC)	5
