= Headgirl =

Collaboration between Motörhead and Girlschool

Headgirl was a collaboration between the English rock groups Motörhead and Girlschool, active occasionally between 1978 and 1981. They recorded St. Valentine's Day Massacre EP, credited as Motör Headgirl School on the EP.

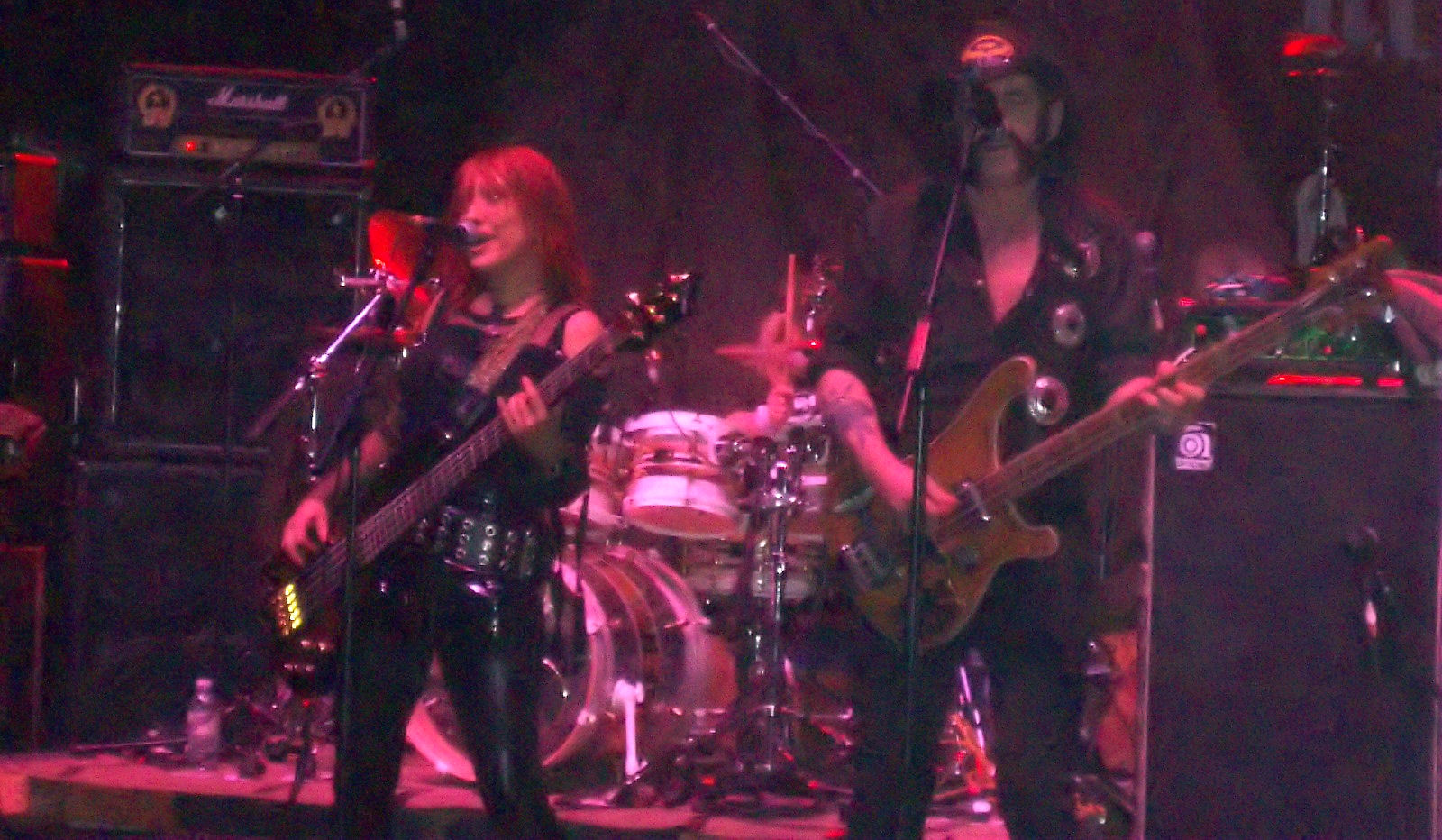
Enid Williams and Lemmy performing with Girlschool in 2009

== History ==
The collaboration between Motörhead and Girlschool started in March 1979, when Motörhead began their first big tour with Overkill and Girlschool were their opening act. Lemmy had heard Girlschool's single "Take It All Away" and thought they were "fucking excellent" and liked the idea of girls being in a band. In his opinion, Kelly Johnson was as good as any guitarist that he had ever seen in his life and "wanted to stick it up these pompous bastard guitarists' arses". In late December 1980, Motörhead's drummer, Phil Taylor, broke his neck, preventing his continuing to play, so Motörhead's producer, Vic Maile, suggested they record a single with Girlschool. Lemmy chose "Please Don't Touch" by one of his favourite groups of the past, Johnny Kidd & the Pirates. For the flipside, the bands recorded each other's songs — Girlschool performed "Bomber" and Motörhead performed "Emergency", although Denise Dufort played drums throughout. The record was released on 14 February 1981, as St. Valentine's Day Massacre EP and in reaching No. 5 in the UK Singles Chart, it became the biggest hit either band ever had in that chart. On 6 February 1981, the bands had been filmed in concert for a Nottingham TV show called Rockstage and on 19 February 1981, billed as "Headgirl", they appeared on Top of the Pops playing "Please Don't Touch". With Girlschool as special guests on the Motörhead 2005 'Inferno UK Tour', Lemmy joined the band at the end of their set at Brixton Academy on 19 November to play "Please Don't Touch" for the first time live.

In 1981, a Japanese 12" single was released on the Bronze/Victor label, based on "Please Don't Touch" under the name 'Motorschool'. Issued in a picture sleeve, it included "Bomber" played by Girlschool, "Emergency" and "Bomber" played by Motörhead, and "Emergency" and "Yeah Right" played by Girlschool. Lyrics to the songs were printed in English and Japanese.

Bronze used the Headgirl collaboration again in 1981, this time for a 12" vinyl release —only in the Netherlands— called Stay Clean, in the Hard Rock On 12 Inch series. The record plays "Stay Clean" and "Metropolis" both in Live-versions by Motörhead on the A-side, and "Please Don't Touch" by Headgirl and "Demolition Boys" in a Live-version by Girlschool on the B-side. ("Metropolis" is missing on the sleeve and label).

Motörhead broke up at the end of 2015, while Girlschool still perform at present.

== Discography ==
- 1981: Valentine's Day Massacre (EP)
- 1981: Stay Clean (EP)
- 1981: Motorschool (EP)
