= St. Valentine's Day Massacre (EP) =

EP by Headgirl
- Released: 13 February 1981
- Recorded: December 1980
- Studio: Jacksons Studios, Rickmansworth, Hertfordshire
- Genre: Heavy metal
- Length: 9:33
- Label: Bronze
- Producer: Vic Maile

Motörhead chronology
Beer Drinkers and Hell Raisers (EP) (1980)	St. Valentine's Day Massacre (1981)	No Sleep 'til Hammersmith (1981)

Girlschool chronology
Demolition (1980)	St. Valentine's Day Massacre (1981)	Hit and Run (1981)

Professional ratings
Review scores
Source	Rating
AllMusic	2.5/5 stars

St. Valentine's Day Massacre is an EP recorded by members of Motörhead and their Bronze Records labelmates Girlschool, under the moniker Headgirl. It reached number five in the UK Singles Charts in 1981.

== Recording ==
When Girlschool were recording in Rickmansworth with producer Vic Maile, he had the idea that Motörhead and Girlschool should record a single together. The result was this three-track EP, on which the bands duetted on a cover of Johnny Kidd & The Pirates' "Please Don't Touch." The bands also covered each other, with Motörhead performing Girlschool's "Emergency" and Girlschool playing Motörhead's "Bomber." The EP was recorded while Motörhead's drummer Phil "Philthy Animal" Taylor was unavailable to perform due an injury, so Girlschool drummer Denise Dufort played on all three songs. The artwork features the two bands dressed as prohibition era gangsters and their molls.

In his autobiography White Line Fever, vocalist/bassist Lemmy Kilmister took aim at critics who accused him of being a sexist, citing his work with Girlschool. He stated: "When I find good women rockers, I'll lend them a hand. I'll never get any kind of credit for helping advance women in rock 'n' roll, but I have." In 2011, he admitted to John McNair of Mojo, "Truthfully, it's the women that I've lost I think about, not ex-members of Motorhead. Wendy O. Williams was a great woman. Fucking mental. And Kelly Johnson from Girlschool - she died young as well, which was a terrible, terrible shame. I had a small affair with Kelly. She was a good looking girl and a great guitarist. People used to say, "She's all right for a girl,' and I'd be like, 'She's better than you, motherfucker!' On a good night Kelly played like Jeff Beck."

== Release ==
The EP was released in 1981 in 7" and 10" vinyl formats, with the same cover and track listing. It reached No. 5 in the UK Singles Chart. A bootleg St. Valentine's Day Massacre exists, a double 12" vinyl album with white labels. It contains recordings of Motörhead and Girlschool's sets from a 1981 Rockstage TV Special from the Theatre Royal in Nottingham. On 19 February 1981, under the name Headgirl, the two bands played "Please Don't Touch" on BBC TV's Top of the Pops to support the release of the EP. They also performed the song on episode 62 of the German TV show Musikladen, that aired on 4 April 1981.

The songs "Please Don't Touch" and "Emergency" were both on the 1984 compilation album No Remorse and then subsequently the 1996 Castle Records reissue of Ace of Spades. However, the tracks were omitted from the 2005 Sanctuary Records 2 cd deluxe edition, which is part of Sanctuary's remaster series of the first six studio albums released under Bronze and GWR.

== Critical reception ==
Joel McIver points out in his 2011 book on the band Overkill: The Untold Story of Motorhead, "Although the EP reached number 5 on the UK singles chart and even the critics gave it a begrudging thumbs-up, more than a few purists regard it as a sidestep into less serious, almost novelty territory that marked the beginning of a worrying tendency on Motorhead's part to get involved in projects that were beneath them." AllMusic: "This glorious artifact documents one of the most peculiar detours in Motörhead's uniformly pedal-to-the-metal career."

== Track listing ==
No.	Title	Writer(s)	Players	Length
1.	"Please Don't Touch"	Johnny Kidd, Guy Robinson	Lemmy, Kelly, Eddie, Enid, Kim & Denise	2:49
2.	"Bomber"	Kilmister, Clarke, Taylor	Kelly, Enid, Kim & Denise	3:30
3.	"Emergency"	Denise Dufort, Kelly Johnson, Kim McAuliffe, Enid Williams	Lemmy, Eddie & Denise	3:03

== Personnel ==
- Lemmy Kilmister – bass (1 & 3), co-lead vocals (1), backing vocals (3)
- Kelly Johnson – lead guitar (1 & 2), co-lead vocals (1)
- "Fast" Eddie Clarke – lead guitar (1 & 3), lead vocals (3)
- Kim McAuliffe – rhythm guitar (1 & 2), backing vocals (2 & 3)
- Enid Williams – bass (1 & 2), lead vocals (2)
- Denise Dufort – drums all tracks
- Phil "Philthy Animal" Taylor – insults & inspiration

== Charts ==
Chart (1981)	Peak position
UK Singles (OCC)	5

== Certifications ==
Region	Certification	Certified units/sales
United Kingdom (BPI)	Silver	250,000^{^}
^{^} Shipments figures based on certification alone.
