= Overkill (Motörhead song) =

1979 song by Motörhead

Single by Motörhead

from the album Overkill
- B-side: "Too Late, Too Late"
- Released: 16 February 1979 (UK)
- Recorded: December 1978 – January 1979; Roundhouse Studios; Sound Development Studios
- Genre: Heavy metal; speed metal
- Length: 5:12
- Label: Bronze; EMI
- Songwriters: Eddie Clarke; Ian Kilmister; Phil Taylor
- Producer: Jimmy Miller

Motörhead singles chronology
"Louie Louie" (1978)	"Overkill" (1979)	"No Class" (1979)

"Overkill" is a song by English rock band Motörhead. It was released in 7" and 12" vinyl pressings in 1979. It is backed with B-side "Too Late Too Late" which appears on the CD re-issues of the Overkill album. Early copies came with an "Overkill" badge. The single reached number 39 on the UK Singles Chart.

== Background and release ==
On 9 March 1979, the band played this song on the BBC TV show Top of the Pops to support the release of the single. The song was a live favourite and was frequently featured at Motörhead concerts, often in an extended version.

On 13 April 2019, Motörhead re-released the original single edit of Overkill along with "Bomber" on picture disc as a celebration of the album's 40th anniversaries on Record Store Day. The single edit was made available digitally on 8 March 2019.

== Music ==
The track is notable for Phil "Philthy Animal" Taylor's use of two bass drums.

== Artwork ==
The artwork on the sleeve was created by Joe Petagno, based on his design for the album's cover.

== Legacy ==
"Overkill" is widely considered one of Motörhead's best songs. In 2012, Loudwire ranked the song number three on their list of the top 10 Motörhead songs, and in 2021, Louder Sound ranked the song number one on their list of the top 50 Motörhead songs.

Classic Rock Magazine wrote in 2021: "With two false endings (a trick probably nicked from Status Quo), 'Overkill' was an apocalyptic introduction to a 10-song collection that sent tremors through the hard rock world. Were Motörhead a hard rock band, or were they punks? It could even be proposed that they were responsible for propagating the US thrash metal assault that became popular several years later."

"Overkill" was used as the closing song for Motörhead's final tour, making it the last song the band ever played live.

== In popular culture ==
The song is featured as a track in the video game SSX on Tour, and was re-recorded by Motörhead to be a playable track in the rhythm game Guitar Hero World Tour.

== Personnel ==
- Lemmy – bass, vocals
- "Fast" Eddie Clarke – guitars
- Phil "Philthy Animal" Taylor – drums

== Covers ==
"Overkill"

Song by Metallica

from the album Garage Inc.
- Released: 24 November 1998
- Recorded: December 13, 1995
- Genre: Heavy metal; speed metal
- Length: 4:04
- Label: Elektra
- Songwriters: Eddie Clarke; Lemmy Kilmister; Phil Taylor
- Producers: Bob Rock; James Hetfield; Lars Ulrich

In 1995, during the recording of the album Load, "Overkill", "Damage Case", "Stone Dead Forever" and "Too Late Too Late" were covered by Metallica, as a birthday gift for Lemmy, and released in 1996 on their "Hero of the Day" single. The single was released as a two-CD single; "Overkill" is the second track on the first CD single, and was also used on the second disc of their 1998 cover album Garage Inc.. The single reached No. 60 on the US Billboard Hot 100 and No. 1 on the Hot Mainstream Rock Tracks, and No. 17 on the UK Singles Chart. Some of the songs were played live on a brief tour along with other tracks from Garage Inc. in 1998 which concluded at the Roseland Ballroom in New York City. The songs were finally played again during the 2009 World Magnetic Tour.

The song was covered by Overkill, who took their name from the Overkill album by Motörhead, and appears as the first track on their 1999 album Coverkill.

In 2008, German heavy metal band Grave Digger included a cover version of the song on their EP Pray.

On 14 September 2011, members of Metallica, Slayer, Megadeth, and Anthrax, collectively known as "the big four" of thrash metal, covered the song live at Yankee Stadium in the Bronx.
