= Ace of Spades (Motörhead album) =

1980 studio album by Motörhead

Studio album by Motörhead
- Released: October 1980
- Recorded: 4 August – 15 September 1980
- Studios: Jackson's Studios (Rickmansworth, England)
- Genres: Heavy metal; hard rock; speed metal
- Length: 36:42
- Label: Bronze
- Producer: Vic Maile

Motörhead chronology
The Golden Years (EP) (1980)	Ace of Spades (1980)	Beer Drinkers and Hell Raisers (EP) (1980)

CD & DVD
- Cover of the 2005 CD remaster and Classic Albums DVD release

Singles from Ace of Spades
- 1. "Ace of Spades" Released: 17 October 1980

Ace of Spades is the fourth studio album by the English rock band Motörhead, released in October 1980 via Bronze Records. It is the band's most commercially successful album, peaking at number four on the UK Albums Chart and reaching gold status in the UK by March 1981. It was preceded by the release of the title track as a single in October, which peaked at number 15 on the UK Singles Chart inearly November.

It was the band's debut release in the United States, with Mercury Records handling distribution in North America. In 2020, the album was ranked at 408 on Rolling Stone's 500 Greatest Albums of All Time list.

== Background ==
By 1979, Motörhead had released two successful albums, Overkill and Bomber, and had gained a loyal fan following by constant touring and television appearances. Their ferocious, loud proto-thrash playing style appealed equally to punks and heavy metal fans, but in 1979 Sounds writer Geoff Barton coined the term "New Wave of British Heavy Metal" (NWOBHM) to classify a slew of newer bands such as Iron Maiden, Def Leppard, and Saxon. Motörhead – a band that resented being labelled anything other than rock 'n' roll – was placed in this new genre, which would go on to influence the emerging thrash metal movement that would include bands like Metallica and Megadeth. In the 2011 book Overkill: The Untold Story of Motörhead, Joel McIver quotes vocalist and bassist Lemmy:

I like Iron Maiden and Saxon out of the new mob, and that's about it, really... We were too late for the first metal movement and early for the next one... Motörhead don't fit into any category, really. We're not straight heavy metal, because we're a rock 'n' roll band, which no-one knows how to market anymore.

Regardless, the association with NWOBHM would be another positive element in the increasing momentum that would lead to the band's most successful commercial period at the beginning of the new decade. In fact, United Artists decided to finally release the band's "lost" first album at this time under the title On Parole, which had originally been recorded in 1976 but shelved because it was deemed commercially unviable. Next, the Big Beat label, which had taken over Chiswick's catalogue, released Beer Drinkers and Hell Raisers, packaging four extra tracks that the band had laid down for their debut album. Further evidence of Motörhead's nascent mainstream success was the release of the EP The Golden Years in May 1980 on Bronze Records, which became their highest charting release to date, peaking at No. 8.

== Recording ==
Motörhead recorded Ace of Spades with Vic Maile at Jackson's Studios in Rickmansworth in August and September 1980. Maile, who had worked with the likes of Jimi Hendrix, Led Zeppelin, and the Who, had crossed paths with Lemmy when he was a member of Hawkwind. The bassist recalls in his 2002 memoir White Line Fever:

He used to own a mobile studio – Hawkwind hired it out to do Space Ritual and he came with it... Vic was a great man and a great producer, really brilliant... Those were good times; we were winning, we were younger, and we believed it.

As Steffan Chirazi observes in the liner notes to the 1996 reissue of Ace of Spades:

Vic Maile at the production helm used an expert ear to translate the monstrous live sound and feel of the band to vinyl.

Maile, who was affectionately nicknamed "Turtle" by the band (for his resemblance to the reptile), was critical in giving Motörhead a sleeker sound on record without sacrificing its raw power. Diminutive and soft-spoken, Maile was well equipped to deal with the trio, who were notorious for in-fighting and general unmanageability. In the documentary The Guts and the Glory, drummer Phil "Philthy Animal" Taylor remembers:

Even if he was angry, he was angry like this: (assumes soft-spoken tone) 'You're not supposed to do it like that,' or 'Stop that boys .'" Lemmy concurs, "Vic was great. He was the first one who told us we were all cunts and work harder. He had a very dry persona: 'Is that really the best shot you've got?'

In 2015, Clarke recalled to John Robinson of Uncut:

He didn't drink, he didn't smoke, and he was very delicate because he was diabetic. He had to have his Ryvita at six o'clock. We couldn't get heavy with him, couldn't fucking shake him, you know what I mean? He might die! So we had to listen to him.

Whereas the band had previously had an input at the mixing stage, Maile took sole responsibility here, Clarke explaining that the result was "you can finally hear everything that's going on." Of the performances, Lemmy stated "Vic got me singing instead of just shouting all the time", while Taylor added "and he got me playing more solid."

== Composition ==
The album includes some of the band's most popular songs, including "The Chase Is Better Than the Catch", "(We Are) the Road Crew", and the hit single "Ace of Spades", which rose to No. 15 on the UK Singles Chart. In his autobiography, White Line Fever, Lemmy speaks at length about the tune:

I used gambling metaphors, mostly cards and dice – when it comes to that sort of thing, I'm more into the slot machines actually, but you can't really sing about spinning fruit, and the wheels coming down. Most of the song's just poker, really - 'I know you've got to see me, read 'em and weep, Dead man's hand again, aces and eights' - that was Wild Bill Hickock's hand when he got shot. To be honest, although "Ace of Spades" is a good song, I'm sick to death of it now. Two decades on, when people think of Motörhead, they think "Ace of Spades." We didn't become fossilised after that record, you know. We've had quite a few good releases since then. But the fans want to hear it so we still play it every night. For myself, I've had enough of that song.

In 2011, Lemmy admitted to James McNair of Mojo:

I'm glad we got famous for that rather than for some turkey, but I sang 'The eight of spades' for two years and nobody noticed.

The song "(We Are) the Road Crew" was written as a tribute to the band's roadies. In the 2004 Classic Albums documentary on the making of the album, guitarist "Fast" Eddie Clarke declares:

They were a good crew, and they were proud of how good they were. I would put them up against any crew in the world.

In the same film, Lemmy, who worked as a roadie for Jimi Hendrix and the Nice, recalls that he wrote the song "in ten minutes" and that when roadie Ian "Eagle" Dobbie heard the song "he had a tear in his eye". Many of the songs, such as "Love Me Like a Reptile". "The Chase Is Better Than the Catch", and "Jailbait". blatantly reference sex, which drew the ire of some critics and feminists. Clarke explained to Classic Albums in 2005:

We only thought of ourselves as a good time rock 'n' roll band, really... But we weren't trying to get a message across, apart from have a good time, you know: get pissed, get stoned, and fuck a chick. And that'll do.

== Release ==
Motörhead appeared on Top of the Pops twice in October to promote the single "Ace of Spades", and were guests on the ITV children's morning show Tiswas on 8 November. The band undertook a UK tour from 22 October through to 2 December under the banner Ace Up Your Sleeve, with support from Girlschool and Vardis. After the Belfast show on 2 December, hijinks resulted in Taylor breaking his neck forcing him to wear a neck-brace and curtailing any further band activity. The other members of the band took the opportunity to collaborate with Girlschool for the St. Valentine's Day Massacre EP.

== Artwork ==
Like the song "Shoot You in the Back", the Ace of Spades artwork employs a classic wild west motif. Originally the idea for the album cover was to have it in a sepia tone and have gunfighters at a card table, but the band decided against it. They decided instead to have themselves in the desert dressed as cowboys. The 'Arizona desert-style' pictures used on the album sleeve and tour programme were taken during a photo session at a sandpit in Barnet. Each of their cowboy outfits were based on different type of Western protagonist. Eddie was based on Clint Eastwood's character, The Man with No Name from the Dollars Trilogy. Phil's costume was based on Marlon Brando's character Rio in One-Eyed Jacks. Lemmy's costume was claimed by Phil to be inspired from Bret Maverick from the TV show Maverick. Contrary to popular belief, the sky was not real and was airbrushed in due to it being very cloudy that day.

== Critical reception ==
Professional ratings
Review scores
Source	Rating
AllMusic	4.5/5 stars
Robert Christgau	B
Collector's Guide to Heavy Metal	10/10
The Encyclopedia of Popular Music	4/5 stars
Q	4/5 stars
The Rolling Stone Album Guide	4.5/5 stars
Sounds	5/5 stars
Spin	10/10
Spin Alternative Record Guide	8/10

The album has been described as "one of the best metal albums by any band, ever" and a significantly influential "hard rock classic". Robert Christgau stated: "Punks have never bought his leather jacket and indie connections because Lemmy Kilmister's grizzled-biker-born-to-rock is metal without the heavy—no preening solos or blow-dried bullshit. I recommend the bit where he promises to get fast and loose with his latest receptacle as soon as he finishes the song about it (not her, of course not), and note that his writing is more one-note than need be, wit and all--fucking for the hell of it can drive anybody into a rage, and tuneless fucking for the hell of it is really pointless." AllMusic calls it "rock-solid, boasting several superlative standouts" and insists it "rightly deserves its legacy as a classic". Sid Smith of BBC Music enthused in 2007:

When Lemmy sings the lyrics to '(We Are) The Road Crew' it's the sound of a grizzled veteran who has been there, done that and gone back for second helpings... If ever a piece of music was a manifesto for the mad, bad and dangerous to know party then the title track is it. Unrepentant and full of hell, there's not one note out of place.

Despite the band always referring to their music as rock 'n' roll, the album, and particularly its title track, have been considered amongst the most influential in the development of thrash metal. The title track is, for many, the definitive Motörhead anthem.

The album is listed in the book 1001 Albums You Must Hear Before You Die. In 2020, it was ranked at 408 on Rolling Stone's 500 Greatest Albums of All Time list.

== Classic Albums documentary ==
On 28 March 2005, the documentary about the album (a part of the Classic Albums series) was released on DVD by Eagle Vision. The in-depth look at the making of the album includes interviews with and performances by Lemmy, Phil Taylor and Eddie Clarke.

== Track listing ==
=== International version ===
All tracks are written by Ian Fraser Kilmister, Eddie Clarke and Phil Taylor except where noted

Side A
No.	Title	Length
1.	"Ace of Spades"	2:48
2.	"Love Me Like a Reptile"	3:23
3.	"Shoot You in the Back"	2:39
4.	"Live to Win"	3:37
5.	"Fast and Loose"	3:23
6.	"(We Are) The Road Crew"	3:13

Side B
No.	Title	Length
7.	"Fire, Fire"	2:44
8.	"Jailbait"	3:33
9.	"Dance"	2:38
10.	"Bite the Bullet"	1:38
11.	"The Chase Is Better Than the Catch"	4:18
12.	"The Hammer"	2:48
Total length:		36:42

=== Original US version ===
Side A
No.	Title	Length
1.	"The Chase Is Better Than the Catch"	4:15
2.	"Love Me Like a Reptile"	3:21
3.	"Shoot You in the Back"	2:37
4.	"Live to Win"	3:34
5.	"Fast and Loose"	3:22
6.	"(We Are) the Road Crew"	3:10

Side B
No.	Title	Length
1.	"Ace of Spades"	2:46
2.	"Fire Fire"	2:42
3.	"Jailbait"	3:31
4.	"Dance"	2:36
5.	"Bite the Bullet"	1:38
6.	"The Hammer"	2:45

=== Castle Communications 1996 CD reissue ===
Bonus tracks
No.	Title	Writer(s)	Original release	Length
13.	"Dirty Love"		B-side of Ace of Spades single	2:57
14.	"Please Don't Touch"	Johnny Kidd, Guy Robinson	St. Valentine's Day Massacre EP	2:49
15.	"Emergency"	Kim McAuliffe, Enid Williams, Kelly Johnson, Denise Dufort	St. Valentine's Day Massacre EP	3:00

=== Sanctuary Records 2005 2-CD deluxe edition ===
Disc one includes the original album without bonus tracks.

All tracks are written by Kilmister, Clarke, Taylor.

Disc two
No.	Title	Original release	Length
1.	"Dirty Love"	B-Side of Ace of Spades single	2:55
2.	"Ace of Spades (Rare)" (Demo)	Dirty Love CD release	3:03
3.	"Love Me Like a Reptile" (Demo)	Dirty Love CD release	4:16
4.	"Love Me Like a Reptile" (Alternative Version)	Stone Dead Forever CD release	3:31
5.	"Shoot You in the Back" (Demo)	Dirty Love CD release	3:11
6.	"Fast and Loose" (Demo)	Dirty Love CD release	3:06
7.	"(We Are) the Road Crew" (Demo)	Dirty Love CD release	3:24
8.	"Fire, Fire" (Alternative Version)	Stone Dead Forever CD release	2:41
9.	"Jailbait" (Alternative Version)	Stone Dead Forever CD release	3:33
10.	"The Hammer" (Alternative Version)	Stone Dead Forever CD release	3:11
11.	"Dirty Love" (Outtake)	Dirty Love CD release	1:02
12.	"Dirty Love" (Demo)	Dirty Love CD release	3:51
13.	"Fast and Loose" (Live - BBC Radio 1 Dave Jensen Show, Maida Vale 4 Studio, London, 1 October 1981)		4:18
14.	"Live to Win" (Live - BBC Radio 1 Dave Jensen Show, Maida Vale 4 Studio, London, 1 October 1981)		3:33
15.	"Bite the Bullet / The Chase Is Better Than the Catch" (Live - BBC Radio 1 Dave Jensen Show, Maida Vale 4 Studio, London, 1 October 1981)		6:05

- Dirty Love is an official release by Eddie Clarke on Receiver Records Ltd. in 1989 (which nonetheless features the name "Motörhead" on the front and back album covers), which had various outtakes from the Ace of Spades sessions on it. It includes the tracks "Hump on your Back", "Waltz of the Vampire", "Bastard" and "Godzilla Akimbo", which are all demos that never got to be mastered at the time, but were done so in poor quality later for this release. These four tracks are also credited to Clarke solely on this release, even though it is the three members of Motörhead playing on the tracks.
- The 1996 reissue is missing Girlschool covering "Bomber", and the 2005 reissue is missing the tracks completely, from the St. Valentines Day Massacre EP the bands did in 1981 for their shared label Bronze Records.

=== BMG 40th anniversary deluxe edition ===
On 30 October 2020, BMG released a deluxe box set of the album, which includes seven 12" LPs, one 10" EP and a DVD. Beside the normal album, which is presented in a special 40th Anniversary Master, the box set included the album Riders Wearing Black, which is a live recording made on 23 December 1981, at the Whitla Hall in Belfast. Another live recording, made on 5 March 1981, at Parc Expo in Orleans, is called Dead Man's Hand. The rarity collection is called The Good, The Bad & The Ugly. The set comes with a 10" EP, which includes seven instrumental demos, titles A Fistful Of Instrumentals. Pre-orders from the official shop of the band were able to receive a Dutch replica of the Ace Of Spades single, with the instrumental of the song on the b-side.

Riders Wearing Black - Live in Belfast - 1981
No.	Title	Length
1.	"Ace Of Spades"	2:51
2.	"Stay Clean"	2:36
3.	"Over The Top"	3:09
4.	"The Hammer"	3:22
5.	"Shoot You In The Back"	2:51
6.	"Metropolis"	3:55
7.	"Jailbait"	3:29
8.	"Leaving Here"	3:21
9.	"Capricorn"	5:03
10.	"Too Late Too Late"	3:12
11.	"(We Are) The Road Crew"	4:44
12.	"No Class"	2:50
13.	"Bite The Bullet"	2:11
14.	"The Chase Is Better Than The Catch"	0:55
15.	"Overkill"	7:19
16.	"Bomber"	4:09
17.	"Motorhead"	4:40

Dead Man's Hand - Live in Orléans
No.	Title	Length
1.	"Ace Of Spades"	2:51
2.	"Stay Clean"	2:34
3.	"Over The Top"	3:33
4.	"Metropolis"	3:41
5.	"Shoot You In The Back"	2:10
6.	"The Hammer"	3:20
7.	"Jailbait"	4:23
8.	"Leaving Here"	3:35
9.	"Fire, Fire"	4:59
10.	"Love Me Like A Reptile"	4:19
11.	"Capricorn"	4:26
12.	"Too Late, Too Late"	4:53
13.	"(We Are) The Road Crew"	3:57
14.	"No Class"	3:23
15.	"Bite The Bullet"	1:39
16.	"The Chase Is Better Than The Catch"	4:24
17.	"Overkill"	5:20
18.	"Bomber"	4:08

The Good, the Broke & the Ugly
No.	Title	Original release	Length
1.	"Ace Of Spades" (Alternate Version)	Dirty Love CD release	3:03
2.	"Dirty Love"	B-Side of Ace of Spades single	2:54
3.	"Love Me Like a Reptile" (Alternate Long Version)	Dirty Love CD release	4:15
4.	"Shoot You In The Back" (Alternate Version)	Dirty Love CD release	3:08
5.	"Hump On Your Back"	Dirty Love CD release	3:41
6.	"Fast and Loose" (Alternate Version)	Dirty Love CD release	3:05
7.	"(We Are) the Road Crew" (Alternate Version)	Dirty Love CD release	3:22
8.	"Fire, Fire" (Alternate Version)	Stone Dead Forever CD release	2:39
9.	"Jailbait" (Alternate Version)	Stone Dead Forever CD release	3:31
10.	"Waltz Of The Vampire"	Dirty Love CD release	3:38
11.	"The Hammer" (Alternate Version)	Stone Dead Forever CD release	3:10
12.	"Dirty Love" (Alternate Long Version)	Dirty Love CD release	3:50
13.	"Bastard"	Dirty Love CD release	3:02
14.	"Godzilla Akimbo"	Dirty Love CD release	2:15
15.	"Love Me Like A Reptile" (Alternate Version)	Stone Dead Forever CD release	3:29
16.	"Dirty Love" (Alternate Version)	Dirty Love CD release	1:02
17.	"Please Don't Touch" (Performed by HeadGirl)	St. Valentines Day Massacre EP release	2:47
18.	"Bomber" (Performed by Girlschool)	St. Valentines Day Massacre EP release	3:35
19.	"Emergency"	St. Valentines Day Massacre EP release	2:59

A Fistful of Instrumentals
No.	Title	Original release	Length
1.	"Ace Of Spades" (Instrumental Demo)	Previously unreleased	3:08
2.	"Hump On Your Back" (Instrumental Demo)	Previously unreleased	3:34
3.	"Shoot You In The Back" (Instrumental Demo)	Previously unreleased	3:05
4.	"Fast And Loose" (Instrumental Demo)	Previously unreleased	3:08
5.	"Dirty Love" (Instrumental Demo)	Previously unreleased	4:43
6.	"Love Me Like A Reptile" (Instrumental Demo)	Previously unreleased	4:15
7.	"Dance" (Instrumental Demo)	Previously unreleased	3:44

== Personnel ==
Per the album's liner notes. Motörhead

- Lemmy – bass, vocals, backing vocals on "Emergency"
- "Fast" Eddie Clarke – lead guitar, lead vocals on "Emergency"
- Phil "Philthy Animal" Taylor – drums except on "Please Don't Touch" & "Emergency"

Additional musicians

- Kim McAuliffe – rhythm guitar on "Please Don't Touch"
- Kelly Johnson – co-lead vocals & co-lead guitar on "Please Don't Touch"
- Enid Williams – bass on "Please Don't Touch" (Note: Enid and Lemmy play bass on the track, making it a six piece for this song)
- Denise Dufort – drums on "Please Don't Touch" & "Emergency" (Note: Dufort plays all the drums on the EP because Taylor had a broken neck at the time)

Production

- Vic "Chairman" Maile – production, engineering, mixing
- Giovanni Scatola – mastering (2005 remaster)
- Martin Poole – design
- Alan Ballard – photography
- Curt Evans – 2005 cover design
- Joe Petagno – Snaggletooth

2005 deluxe edition remaster

- Steve Hammonds – release coordination
- Jon Richards – release coordination
- Malcolm Dome – sleeve notes
- Mick Stevenson – project consultant, photos and archive memorabilia

== Charts ==
Chart (1980–81)	Peak position
Canada Top Albums/CDs (RPM)	29
Norwegian Albums (VG-lista)	37
UK Albums (Official Charts)	4

Chart (2020)	Peak position
Austrian Albums (Ö3 Austria)	42
Belgian Albums (Ultratop Flanders)	50
Belgian Albums (Ultratop Wallonia)	51
Finnish Albums (Suomen virallinen lista)	40
French Albums (SNEP)	178
German Albums (Offizielle Top 100)	10
Scottish Albums (Official Charts)	19
Spanish Albums (Promusicae)	36
Swiss Albums (Schweizer Hitparade)	39
UK Albums (Official Charts)	89
UK Independent Albums (Official Charts)	11
UK Rock & Metal Albums (Official Charts)	4

Chart (2025)	Peak position
Greek Albums (IFPI)	24

== Certifications ==
Region	Certification	Certified units/sales
United Kingdom (BPI)	Gold	100,000^{^}
^{^} Shipments figures based on certification alone.

== Release history ==
Date	Region	Label	Catalogue	Format	Notes
October 1980	United Kingdom	Bronze	BRON531	LP	Peaked at No. 4 in the UK Albums Chart
October 1980	United Kingdom	Bronze	BRONG531	LP	
October 1980	Italy	Bronze	BROL 34531	LP	
October 1980	Germany	Bronze	202 876-270	LP	Some mispressed with side one on both sides
October 1980	United States	Mercury	SRM-1-4011	LP	Different track running order
1986	United Kingdom	GWR	GWLP6	LP	
1986	United Kingdom	Legacy	LLMCD 3013	CD	
1988	United States	Profile	PCD-3243	CD	
1988	United States	Profile	PRO-3243	LP	
1991	United Kingdom	Castle	CLACD 240	CD	Liner notes by Mörat from Kerrang!
1996	United Kingdom	Essential; Castle	ESM CD 312	CD	Includes three bonus tracks
2003	Italy	Earmark	41003	LP	
28 January 2003	United Kingdom	Silverline	2881339	DVD-Audio	Surround Sound format
2005	United States	Sanctuary	06076-86408-2	2xCD	

- The labels on the 1986 GWR re-issue had the GWR logo and "A" on one side, and side two on the other. The tracks were also erroneously listed in the order of the US release.
