= Bomber (song) =

Single by Motörhead

from the album Bomber
- B-side: "Over the Top"
- Released: November 1979 (UK)
- Recorded: 7 July – 31 August 1979; Roundhouse Studios; Olympic Studios
- Genre: Heavy metal; hard rock; speed metal
- Length: 3:43
- Label: Bronze
- Songwriters: Eddie Clarke; Ian Kilmister; Phil Taylor
- Producer: Jimmy Miller

Motörhead singles chronology
"No Class" (1979)	"Bomber" (1979)	"Ace of Spades" (1980)

"Bomber" is a song by the English heavy metal band Motörhead, recorded and released in 1979 (see 1979 in music). It is the title track to their album Bomber and was released as a single peaking at 34 on the UK Singles Chart.

The single was released in the UK by Bronze Records as a 7-inch vinyl single with the first 20,000 copies pressed in blue vinyl and thereafter in black. The band promoted its release with an appearance on the BBC TV show Top of the Pops on 3 December.

On 13 April 2019, Motörhead re-released the original single of Bomber for the first time since 1979, along with the single edit of "Overkill" on picture disc as a celebration of the albums 40th anniversaries on Record Store Day.

== Background ==
In an interview in 2015 with Rolling Stone Lemmy recalled the origin of the song

"I was reading Len Deighton's book Bomber at the time I wrote it. It's about a bombing raid on Germany when the British hit the wrong town, and it's what goes on the floor in the air from both sides. It's a really good book. You should read it. "Bomber" was the first song I wrote about war. We made a big bomber lighting rig for the tour and we've still got it. It's big; it's about 40 feet down, 25 or 30 feet across and it's got lit-up propellers on it. It gets a truck all by itself."

== Other versions ==
The song became a staple of the band's live set, with live versions being released on the albums No Sleep 'til Hammersmith, Everything Louder than Everyone Else, Live at Brixton Academy, Better Motörhead than Dead: Live at Hammersmith, The Wörld Is Ours - Vol. 2: Anyplace Crazy as Anywhere Else and Clean Your Clock; and on the video releases The Birthday Party, 25 & Alive Boneshaker and The Best of Motörhead.

== "Over The Top" ==
The B-side of the single was the non-album track "Over the Top", which has subsequently been included as a bonus track on the re-mastered Bomber album.

The song was also performed as a joint collaboration between Motörhead and The Damned for inclusion on the proposed "Ballroom Blitz" single, but the recording session ended in drunkenness and the results were deemed unsuitable for release. The recording was, however, finally issued in 2003 on the Stone Deaf Forever! boxset. The Damned included the track on their compilation CD "Tales From The Damned" (released 1993, Cleopatra Records - CLEO71392), performed as "MotörDamned" with the following personnel: Rat Scabies, Lemmy, Fast Eddie, Captain Sensible, Philthy Animal Taylor, Dave Vanian, Algy Ward.

Live versions of this song have been released as the B-side to the 1981 single "Motorhead", on the 2005 video Stage Fright and on the 2007 album Better Motörhead than Dead: Live at Hammersmith.

== Single track listing ==
1. "Bomber" (Ian Kilmister, Eddie Clarke, Phil Taylor) - 3:45
2. "Over the Top" (Kilmister, Clarke, Taylor) - 3:12

== Personnel ==
- Ian "Lemmy" Kilmister – bass, vocals
- "Fast" Eddie Clarke – guitar
- Phil "Philthy Animal" Taylor – drums

== Cover versions ==
- Girlschool covered the song on the St. Valentine's Day Massacre EP, a joint release between the two bands. This cover is also on the soundtrack to the game Brütal Legend.
- Mudhoney released the cover version as a B-side to their 1992 single "Suck You Dry", and has been included as a bonus track on their Piece of Cake album.
- Onslaught recorded its own version featuring Tom Angelripper and Phil Taylor and released it on the Sounds of Violence album (2011).
- U.K. Subs made their version of the song for their covers album Subversions (2018).
- Saxon recorded a version on their covers album Inspirations (2021).
