= Motorhead (song) =

Song by Hawkwind

- "Kings of Speed" single picture sleeve

Song by Hawkwind
- A-side: "Kings of Speed"
- Released: 7 March 1975
- Recorded: January 1975
- Genre: Hard rock; space rock; proto punk
- Length: 3:02
- Songwriter: Ian Kilmister

Alternative cover
- Reissue single cover

"Motorhead" is a song written by Ian "Lemmy" Kilmister, while he was a member of the English space rock band Hawkwind. It was later recorded by (and was the eponym for) Motörhead, as he called the band this instead of Bastard on his then manager's advice.

== Hawkwind versions ==
"Motorhead" was the last song that Lemmy wrote for Hawkwind before being fired from the band in May 1975. It was originally released as the B-side of the single "Kings of Speed" on United Artists Records in March 1975.

The song was written in the Hyatt Hotel (a.k.a. 'Riot House') in West Hollywood, California. Lemmy explains how it was created:

I was on tour with Hawkwind in 1974, we were staying at the Riot House and Roy Wood and Wizzard were also in town. I got this urge to write a song in the middle of the night. I ran downstairs to the Wizzard room, got Roy's Ovation acoustic guitar, then hurried back to mine. I went on to the balcony and howled away for four hours. Cars were stopping and the drivers were listening then driving off, and there I was yelling away at the top of my voice." - Lemmy.

The title of the song is British slang for a speed freak. The lyrics were explained by Lemmy:

The six thousand miles was a reference to Los Angeles, and the rest is self-explanatory. And yes, I am the only person to fit the word 'parallelogram' into a rock'n'roll number! I'm very proud of that.

The guitars and bass are tuned down a half-step on the Hawkwind version, effectively making the song's key E♭ Major, but are described here as if in standard tuning. The bass follows the root note for all the chords, with a riff on the F♯, based on the A string between the tenth and twelfth frets. The introduction is in E, ending with two bars each in D and E♭. The verse is in E with a D/E 'kick' at the end of each lyric line, a pre-chorus follows, in G with two lines ending in D, the last in F♯. The chorus, like the pre-chorus is in G, but with only two lines, ending in D and F♯. The song consists of three verses in total.

There is a jazz-inspired violin solo break by keyboard player Simon House which, based on the verse/pre-chorus/chorus pattern, occurs after the second chorus.

The original backing tracks for "Kings of Speed" were taken by Dave Brock from the Olympic Studios recording session, and he later added overdubs and re-released it through independent record companies. In July 1981 "Motorhead" was released as the A-side to a 7" and 12" single on the Flicknife label, this time having a Brock vocal and synthesizer overdubs, the B-side being "Valium Ten". Flicknife re-released the single as a 12" vinyl in October 1982.

"Motorhead" was also used by Hawkwind on their 1986 single "Motorhead"/"Hurry on Sundown", released on Flicknife Records.

From 1992 the song has been added to CD re-issues of Hawkwind's Warrior on the Edge of Time album. The song has also appeared on various compilation albums, such as British Tribal Music, The Hawkwind Collection and The Hawkwind Anthology Vol. II.

== Motörhead versions ==
"Motörhead"

Single by Motörhead

from the album Motörhead
- B-side: "City Kids"
- Released: 17 June 1977
- Recorded: 27–29 April 1977
- Studio: Escape Studios (Kent, England)
- Length: 3:13
- Label: Chiswick
- Songwriter: Ian "Lemmy" Kilmister
- Producer: Speedy Keen

Motörhead singles chronology
"Leaving Here" (1977)	"Motörhead" (1977)	"Louie Louie" (1978)

Audio sample
- file; help

Alternative cover
- 1979 Chiswick picture disc (B-side)

The song was re-recorded by Lemmy's subsequent band Motörhead and released on their 1977 debut album, Motörhead. It was also chosen for release as a 7" vinyl single in June 1977, although it failed to chart. Recorded at Escape Studios, Kent, it was initially issued with the 'Map of Chiswick' label, later it was switched to the 'Big Beat' label and pressed in other formats. Chiswick also released a special 12" vinyl edition which was limited to 12,500 copies. In September 1979 Chiswick released a 7" vinyl picture disc in two pressings, black & white, and blue & white as well as single colour pressings in black, blue, pink, orange and white vinyl.

The band members on the recording were "Fast" Eddie Clarke on guitars and vocals, Phil "Philthy Animal" Taylor on drums, and Lemmy on bass and lead vocals. The track "Motorhead" is credited to Lemmy, the B-side, "City Kids", to Duncan Sanderson and Larry Wallis, who had originally recorded the song with their band the Pink Fairies for their album Kings of Oblivion. Motorhead, with Wallis on guitar, had also recorded a version of both songs for shelved 1975 album On Parole. The single was produced by Speedy Keen and engineered by John Burns. The sleeve photographs are attributed to Motorcycle Irene.

Motörhead recorded a live version, which was released as a 7" vinyl single on 3 July 1981. It fared much better than the original single and reached number six in the UK Singles Charts. Whereas the previous recording plays in E major, this recording plays in E♭, the same as the original Hawkwind version. The single uses recordings made in March 1981 while the band were on their four-day "The Short, Sharp, Pain in the Neck Tour", as were the other tracks on the parent album, No Sleep 'til Hammersmith. Bronze Records released a 7" picture disc, the A-side has the same picture as the cover and the B-side has a white Motörhead logo on black. A promotional 12" vinyl single was released in the USA, with the album's "No Class" track as its B-side. This track has also been featured on unofficial releases, such as the 1993 Castle Communications double album compilation, All the Aces, and Deadline Music's 1999 Golden Years - The Alternate Versions, which was released under licence from Receiver Records.

The track "Motorhead" is credited to Lemmy, its B-side "Over the Top" to Lemmy, "Fast" Eddie Clarke, and Phil "Philthy Animal" Taylor. The band members are the same as on the previous recording.

In 1988 Castle Communications released a 3" CD single of four Motörhead tracks, the inserts states track three is "Motorhead" but actually plays "Jailbait", the edition was limited to 5,000 copies.

In 2008, the song was re-recorded as downloadable content for the rhythm game Guitar Hero III: Legends of Rock, along with "Stay Clean" and "(We Are) The Road Crew". This re-recorded version appeared as a Japanese bonus track on the compilation Under Cöver, released in 2017.

In 2012, Loudwire ranked the song number ten on their list of the top 10 Motörhead songs, and in 2021, Louder Sound ranked the song number seven on their list of the top 50 Motörhead songs.

== Other cover versions ==
- 1981 - Cockney Rejects on Greatest Hits Vol. 3 - Live & Loud
- 1990 - Lawnmower Deth on Ooh Crikey It's... Lawnmower Deth
- 1993 - Corduroy as a single and on their Out of Here album
- 1994 - The Nomads on their Showdown 1981-1993 album
- 1995 - Poison Idea on "Pajama Party"
- 1997 - Primal Scream on their Vanishing Point album
- 1999 - Acid King as bonus track on the re-release of their Busse Woods album
- 2003 - Unkle sampled the bass intro from the Hawkwind version for their song Blackout, featured on Never, Never, Land.
- 2015 - Dutch band Death Alley released it as a 7" single which was sold during shows during 2015, but with the passing of Lemmy Kilmister they made it available online.
- 2016 - The Go Getters on "Born to Raise Hell - A Rockabilly & Psychobilly Tribute to Motörhead in Memory of Lemmy Kilmister by various artists"
