= Please Don't Touch (song) =

Single by Johnny Kidd & the Pirates
- B-side: "Growl" (Johnny Kidd/Guy Robinson)
- Released: 8 May 1959 (UK)
- Recorded: Abbey Road: 18 April 1959
- Genre: Rock and roll
- Label: His Master's Voice POP 615 (UK)
- Songwriters: Johnny Kidd; Guy Robinson
- Producer: Walter J. Ridley

Johnny Kidd & the Pirates singles chronology
| "Please Don't Touch" (1959) | "If You Were The Only Girl In The World" (1959) |

"Please Don't Touch" is the debut single by English rock and roll group Johnny Kidd & the Pirates, released in 1959 and reaching number 25 on the UK Singles Chart.

== Personnel ==
- Johnny Kidd – vocals
- Mike West, Tom Brown – backing vocals
- Alan Caddy – lead guitar
- Tony Doherty – rhythm guitar
- Johnny Gordon – bass
- Ken McKay – drums (McKay was replaced during the session by Don Toye)

== Cover versions ==
- In 1981, Lemmy chose to record the song as the A-side of the Headgirl (Motörhead and Girlschool) collaboration St. Valentine's Day Massacre.
- In 1987, The psychobilly band, I Spit on Your Gravy included a cover on their album, Fruit Loop City
- In 1989, The Meteors on their recording, Attack of the Chainsaw Mutants.
- In 1992, the Stray Cats recorded a rockabilly version of the song for their album Choo Choo Hot Fish.
- In 2003 the song was covered by Throw Rag on their Desert Shores album.

== Chart performance ==
=== Johnny Kidd & the Pirates ===
| Chart (1959) | Peak position |
|---|---|
| UK Singles (Official Charts) | 25 |

=== Headgirl (Motörhead and Girlschool) ===
| Chart (2021) | Peak position |
|---|---|
| UK Singles (Official Charts) | 32 |
