= Overkill (Motörhead album) =

Studio album by Motörhead
- Released: 16 March 1979
- Recorded: December 1978 – January 1979
- Studios: Roundhouse, London; Sound Development, London
- Genres: Heavy metal; hard rock; speed metal
- Length: 34:30
- Label: Bronze
- Producers: Jimmy Miller, Neil Richmond

Motörhead chronology
Motörhead (1977)	Overkill (1979)	Bomber (1979)

Singles from Overkill
- 1. "Overkill" Released: 16 February 1979; 2. "No Class" Released: 15 June 1979

Overkill is the second studio album by English heavy metal band Motörhead, released on 16 March 1979. It was the band's first album with Bronze Records. Kerrang! magazine listed the album at number 46 among the "100 Greatest Heavy Metal Albums of All Time". American thrash metal band Overkill was named after this album.

== Background ==
Bronze Records signed Motörhead in 1978 and booked them time in London's Wessex Studios to record a single consisting of Richard Berry's "Louie Louie" and a new song by the band called "Tear Ya Down". The band toured to promote the single "Louie Louie", which became a modest hit, while Chiswick released the Motörhead album in white vinyl, to keep the momentum going. In the Classic Albums documentary on the making of Ace of Spades, Gerry Bron of Bronze Records admits:

"The first time I heard Motörhead was when I listened to a single that I put out without hearing, which is "Louie Louie," and when I heard it I was absolutely horrified. I thought it was the worst record I've ever heard, so it was a bit of a shock. The bigger shock was, having put out a record I thought was terrible, it went straight into the charts at #72. But I actually put the record out as a favour."

Sales of the single brought the band their first appearance on BBC Television's Top of the Pops, which gave Bronze the confidence to get the band back into the studio to record a second album. In the 2011 book Overkill: The Untold Story of Motörhead, biographer Joel McIver quotes guitarist "Fast" Eddie Clarke:

"We had so many false starts and disappointments by the time Overkill came around in 1978 we had stored up a lot of energy and ideas – and we were just waiting for the opportunity to show what we could do. Also we had a great following, and we always felt we owed the fans who had been with us from the beginning.."

Speaking to James McNair of Mojo in 2011, frontman Lemmy concurred:

"[...] by the time of Overkill we were getting our sound together."

== Recording ==
Overkill was co-produced by legendary producer Jimmy Miller, who had previously worked with Traffic and the Rolling Stones, and recorded at Roundhouse Recording Studios and Sound Development Studios in London. "Damage Case" was co-written by the band and Mick Farren of The Deviants. In his autobiography White Line Fever, Lemmy claims that he wrote the words to "Metropolis" "in five minutes" after seeing the movie of the same name at the Electric Cinema in Portebello Road, and also claims that he always wanted Tina Turner to record "I'll Be Your Sister", insisting:

"I like writing songs for women. In fact, I've written songs with women. I've been called a sexist by some factions of radical, frigid feminists (the kind who want to change the word manhole to personhole, that kind of crap), but they don't know what they're talking about."

The title track is notable for Phil "Philthy Animal" Taylor's use of two bass drums. In the documentary The Guts and the Glory the drummer recalls:

"I always wanted to play two bass drums but I always said to myself, 'No, I'm not gonna be one of these wankers who goes on stage and has two bass drums and never even fuckin' plays 'em'. Not until I can play 'em. So I got this other bass drum and I used to get to rehearsals a couple of hours before the other guys and just practise, you know, just sit there going (mimes kicking with both feet) like running, or something like that...I was actually playing that riff, just trying to get my coordination right, when Eddie and Lemmy walked in, and I was just about to stop and they went, 'No, don't stop! Keep going!'...And that was how Overkill got written."

ZZ Top were an influence on the group and they had previously performed and recorded a version of "Beer Drinkers and Hell Raisers" from Tres Hombres (1973). Lemmy stated "They shaped the music scene for a few years, everyone was waiting for the new ZZ Top album and they'd be great... I stole [the riff of "Tush"] for "No Class". I stole it blind, yeah, but we didn't go where they went after the riff, so that's cool, I suppose".

== Music ==
Classic Rock Magazine said Jimmy Miller's production on the album made the band "sound claustrophobic, wasted, irritable and gloriously unwashed. Which of course they were in life."

== Artwork ==
Joe Petagno, the sleeve artist, had this to say about the cover of the album, which he felt rushed into because the band could not find him:

"I had about a week and a half to get it finished... But it was always a disappointment for me, personally. It should have been multi-layered. It was supposed to have a feeling that there was more to it, there were going to be more bits and pieces. In a way, I kind of did it on the Inferno thing. I sort of took my revenge on the new trinity. In a way."

== Release ==
The first release from those sessions was the single release of the title track backed with "Too Late, Too Late" in 7" and 12" pressings. In June 1979, "No Class" was lifted from the album as a follow-up single, backed with a previously unreleased song, "Like a Nightmare". While the Chiswick album Motörhead had been a hasty affair (although it had a sub-bootleg quality which some fans found appealing) Overkill had more spring and bounce, and a title track that would become a show-stopper for years to come. Three weeks after the initial release of the album in black vinyl, the album was released in a limited edition of 15,000 in green vinyl. With a view to increasing the sales, the single was released in three different covers, one each of Lemmy, Clarke and Taylor. The album was reissued on Cassette, CD and vinyl by Castle Communications in 1988, coupled with Another Perfect Day, Bronze having issued a cassette of the album coupled with Bomber in 1980.

== Reception ==
Professional ratings
Review scores
Source	Rating
AllMusic	4.5/5 stars
Blender	5/5 stars
Classic Rock	4.5/5 stars
Collector's Guide to Heavy Metal	9/10
The Encyclopedia of Popular Music	3/5 stars
Music Week	2/4 stars
The Rolling Stone Album Guide	3.5/5 stars
Spin Alternative Record Guide	7/10
Sputnikmusic	5/5

Overkill was an unexpected success, reaching No. 24 on the UK Albums Chart. It is considered by many to be a vast improvement over the band's debut and the album where they laid the foundation for their classic sound. AllMusic stated that, "Motörhead's landmark second album, Overkill, marked a major leap forward for the band, and it remains one of their all-time best, without question. In fact, some fans consider it their single best, topping even Ace of Spades. It's a ferocious album, for sure, perfectly showcasing Motörhead's trademark style of no holds barred proto-thrash – a kind of punk-inflected heavy metal style that is sloppy and raw yet forceful and in your face", concluding that "Overkill (is) a perfect Motörhead album. Several great ones would follow, of course, but Overkill was the first of the great ones, and quite possibly the greatest of all."

In 2005, Overkill was ranked number 340 in Rock Hard's book of The 500 Greatest Rock & Metal Albums of All Time. However, it has also been criticised for being one dimensional, sloppy and unskilled.

Writing in the 2011 book Overkill: The Untold Story of Motörhead, biographer Joel McIver called the album "a revelation. To this day it contains six all-time classics, which is saying something from a band whose career has lasted 35 years or more."

Overkill was named one of "The Best 25 Heavy Metal Albums of All Time" in the book Sound of the Beast: The Complete Headbanging History of Heavy Metal, by Ian Christe.

== Track listing ==
=== Original release ===
All tracks are written by Ian Fraser Kilmister, Eddie Clarke and Phil Taylor, except "Damage Case", written by Kilmister, Clarke, Taylor and Mick Farren

Side A
No.	Title	Length
1.	"Overkill"	5:12
2.	"Stay Clean"	2:40
3.	"(I Won't) Pay Your Price"	2:56
4.	"I'll Be Your Sister"	2:51
5.	"Capricorn"	4:06

Side B
No.	Title	Length
6.	"No Class"	2:39
7.	"Damage Case"	2:59
8.	"Tear Ya Down"	2:39
9.	"Metropolis"	3:34
10.	"Limb from Limb"	4:54
Total length:		34:30

All tracks are written by Kilmister, Clarke and Taylor, except where noted.

Castle Communications 1996 CD reissue bonus tracks
No.	Title	Writer(s)	Original release	Length
11.	"Too Late, Too Late"		1979 ~ Overkill (Single)	3:25
12.	"Like a Nightmare"		1979 ~ No Class (Single)	4:27
13.	"Louie, Louie"	Richard Berry	1978 ~ Louie, Louie (Single)	2:47
14.	"Tear Ya Down" (Instrumental Version)			2:39
15.	"Louie, Louie" (Alternative Version)	Berry		2:52
Total length:				50:40

=== Sanctuary Records 2005 2-CD deluxe edition ===
Disc one includes the original album without bonus tracks.

All tracks are written by Kilmister, Clarke, Taylor except where noted.

Disc two
No.	Title	Writer(s)	Original release	Length
1.	"Louie, Louie"	Berry	1978 ~ Louie, Louie	2:47
2.	"Louie, Louie" (Alternative Version)	Berry	1979 ~ Overkill (1996 Reissue)	2:52
3.	"Louie, Louie" (Alternative Version 2)	Berry	1997 ~ Stone Dead Forever	2:45
4.	"Tear Ya Down"		1978 ~ Louie, Louie	2:41
5.	"Tear Ya Down" (Alternative Version)		1997 ~ Stone Dead Forever	2:41
6.	"Tear Ya Down" (Instrumental Version)		1979 ~ Overkill (1996 Reissue)	2:39
7.	"Too Late, Too Late"		1979 ~ Overkill (Single)	3:25
8.	"Like a Nightmare" (Alternative Version)		1979 ~ Stone Dead Forever	4:13
9.	"Like a Nightmare"		1979 ~ No Class	4:27

John Peel In-Session (aired 25 September 1978, recorded 18 September 1978)
No.	Title	Writer(s)	Original release	Length
10.	"Louie Louie"	Berry	1978 ~ Louie, Louie	2:46
11.	"I'll Be Your Sister"		1979 ~ Overkill	3:15
12.	"Tear Ya Down"		1979 ~ Overkill	2:39

In-Concert – Live from Paris Theatre, London (16 May 1979)
No.	Title	Original release	Length
13.	"Stay Clean"	1979 ~ Overkill	3:03
14.	"No Class"	1979 ~ Overkill	2:43
15.	"I'll Be Your Sister"	1979 ~ Overkill	3:35
16.	"Too Late, Too Late"	1979 ~ Overkill (single)	3:24
17.	"(I Won't) Pay Your Price"	1979 ~ Overkill	3:19
18.	"Capricorn"	1979 ~ Overkill	4:14
19.	"Limb from Limb"	1979 ~ Overkill	5:26

- The track list in the liner notes incorrectly have 18 tracks listed, as they have repeated tracks 9 & 10 as track 9 twice. They also have Richard Berry incorrectly credited for disc 1 tracks 1, 5 & 9, when correctly it is disc 1 tracks 1–3 and disc 2 track 10. The rear of the cover has all this printed correctly though.

== Personnel ==
Per the album's liner notes.

=== Motörhead ===
- Lemmy – bass, vocals, bass solo on "Stay Clean", second guitar solo on "Limb from Limb"
- "Fast" Eddie Clarke – guitars
- Phil "Philthy Animal" Taylor – drums

=== Production ===
- Jimmy Miller – production, remixing
- Neil Richmond – producer on ("Louie Louie", "Tear Ya Down")
- Ashley Howe – engineering
- Trevor Hallesy – engineering
- Darren Colin Burn – tape operator
- Giovanni Scatola – mastering (2005 remaster)
- Joe Petagno – cover design
- Curt Evans – cover design (2005 remaster)

=== 2005 deluxe edition remaster ===
- Steve Hammonds – release coordination
- Jon Richards – release coordination
- Malcolm Dome – sleeve notes
- Mick Stevenson – project consultant, photos and archive memorabilia

== Charts ==
Chart (1979)	Peak position
French Albums (SNEP)	17
UK Albums (Official Charts)	24

Chart (2019)	Peak position
Belgian Albums (Ultratop Wallonia)	168
German Albums (Offizielle Top 100)	96
Scottish Albums (Official Charts)	73
UK Independent Albums (Official Charts)	25
UK Rock & Metal Albums (Official Charts)	9

Chart (2025)	Peak position
German Albums (Offizielle Top 100)	60
Swiss Albums (Schweizer Hitparade)	77

== Certifications ==
Region	Certification	Certified units/sales
United Kingdom (BPI)	Silver	60,000^{^}
^{^} Shipments figures based on certification alone.
