= Phil Taylor (musician) =

British drummer (1954–2015)

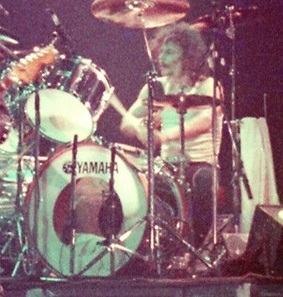
- Taylor at Afan Lido, Port Talbot, in 1982

Background information
- Also known as: Philthy Animal
- Born: Philip John Taylor; 21 September 1954; Hasland, Derbyshire, England
- Died: 12 November 2015 (aged 61) London, England
- Genres: Heavy metal; rock and roll; hard rock; speed metal
- Occupation: Musician
- Instrument: Drums
- Years active: 1968–2015
- Formerly of: Motörhead; Waysted

Philip John Taylor (21 September 1954 – 12 November 2015), better known as "Philthy Animal", was an English drummer. He was a member of the rock band Motörhead from 1975 to 1984 and 1987 to 1992, recording eleven studio albums and four live albums with the band. The Motörhead line-up consisting of Taylor, Lemmy and "Fast" Eddie Clarke is generally regarded as the 'classic' line-up of the band.

== Biography ==
Taylor was born on 21 September 1954 in Hasland, Derbyshire. He lived in Ashington, Northumberland, until he was two years old, and grew up in Leeds, Yorkshire. He took drum lessons at Leeds College of Music on advice from his father. After first meeting Lemmy (who was a fellow speed user) whilst that musician was still in Hawkwind in 1973, he joined Motörhead and replaced Lucas Fox during the recording of the band's first album On Parole in 1975. Lemmy said that Fox was not working out and Taylor "had a car and could give us a lift back down to the studio". Taylor, in turn, introduced Lemmy to guitarist "Fast" Eddie Clarke, having worked with him while painting a houseboat.

Shortly after recording the classic Ace of Spades album in 1980, Taylor broke his neck after being lifted above the head of a friend in a test of strength, only to be dropped on his head. Taylor continued to play in Motörhead with the aid of a neck brace, as is visible in the music video for "Ace of Spades". As a result, Taylor had a prominent lump located on the back of his neck (affectionately referred to as his "knob"), thought to be a calcium deposit caused by his previous spinal trauma. Tour-disrupting injuries were not unfamiliar to Taylor at the time, as he had previously broken his hand whilst punching a man outside his flat in London. Taylor continued to drum by using gaffer tape to attach his drum stick into his hand until it had sufficiently healed.

Taylor left Motörhead in 1984. The following year, he made appearances with Waysted, and joined former Motörhead and Thin Lizzy guitarist Brian Robertson to form the band Operator. In 1986, he was part of Frankie Miller's touring band.

Taylor returned to Motörhead in 1987. He said "I always regretted leaving. Let's just say I took a three-year holiday." He continued playing in the group until 1992. After having been warned three times in the previous two years "to get his act together", he was fired after recording "I Ain't No Nice Guy", because of his poor performance.

From 2005 to 2008, Taylor played and recorded in a group called The Web of Spider with Whitey Kirst (Iggy Pop) on guitar and Max Noce on bass. In 2007, Taylor briefly worked on a project called Capricorn with former Danzig guitarist Todd Youth, former Monster Magnet guitarist Phil Caivano and former Nashville Pussy bassist Corey Parks. After playing in The Web of Spider, Taylor began work on a project with guitarist Chris Holmes, formerly of the heavy metal band W.A.S.P., Between 2005 and 2007 Taylor formed Little Villains with James Childs of UK rock group Airbus, resulting in two posthumous releases Philthy Lies and Taylor Made. In 2009, Taylor joined American thrash metal band Overkill for a set at the Islington Academy. The set included a cover of the Motörhead song from which Overkill took their name.

He sporadically played drums for Mick Farren and The Deviants, featuring on Dr. Crow (2002), Sheep in Wolves' Clothing (2008), and Portobello Shuffle (2009).

Taylor reunited with Lemmy and Clarke on 6 November 2014 at the National Indoor Arena in Birmingham, on stage for Motörhead's classic "Ace of Spades" only to come on to wave to the crowd and leave.

== Death ==
Taylor died on 12 November 2015 in London at the age of 61 after an illness. Liver failure was cited as a cause.

"Fast" Eddie Clarke said of his former bandmate:

My dear friend and brother passed away last night. He had been ill for sometime but that does not make it any easier when the time finally comes. I have known Phil since he was 21 and he was one hell of a character. Fortunately we made some fantastic music together and I have many many fond memories of our time together. Rest in Peace, Phil!

Lemmy told Classic Rock that he was "devastated" to have lost one of his best friends. He also remembered former Motörhead guitarist Michael "Würzel" Burston, who died in 2011.

I am feeling very sad at the moment, in fact devastated because one of my best friends died yesterday. I miss him already. His name was Phil Taylor, or Philthy Animal, and he was our drummer twice in our career. Now he's died and it really pisses me off that they take somebody like him and leave George Bush alive. So muse on that. We're still going, we're still going strong, it's just first Wurzel and now Philthy, it's a shame man. I think this rock 'n' roll business might be bad for the human life.

Lemmy died on 28 December 2015, less than seven weeks after Taylor and on 10 January 2018 "Fast Eddie" Clarke also died.

== Discography ==
=== Motörhead ===
- On Parole (recorded 1975–76, released in 1979)
- Motörhead (1977)
- Overkill (1979)
- Bomber (1979)
- Ace of Spades (1980)
- No Sleep 'til Hammersmith (1981)
- Iron Fist (1982)
- Another Perfect Day (1983)
- Rock 'n' Roll (1987)
- Nö Sleep at All (1988)
- 1916 (1991)
- March ör Die (1992) – "I Ain't No Nice Guy" only
- The Manticore Tapes (recorded 1976, released in 2025)

=== Other recordings ===
- The Muggers Tapes – live recording from a brief spell of about four gigs. Taylor drummed with "Fast" Eddie Clarke on guitar, John "Speedy" Keen, also on guitar, and Billy Wrath on bass. The album was released as a bonus to a Best of Motörhead release.
- Naughty Old Santa's Christmas Classics (1989)
- GMT One By One 12" single (1989)
- GMT War Games – CD release of same tracks plus one other (1991)
- The Deviants Have Left the Planet – drummed with Mick Farren on vocals, Larry Wallis on guitar, etc. (1999)
- Sheep in Wolves' Clothing – Motorheadbangers fan club tribute CD. It features the Deviants Mick Farren on vocals, Andy Colquhoun on guitar, David Ito as the bassist and Taylor as the drummer; re-recorded the Motörhead / Farren song "Lost Johnny" for the CD; released on 7 April 2008.
- Philthy Lies – Little Villains album, released posthumously via Heavy Psyche Sounds Records (2019)
- Taylor Made – Little Villains album, released posthumously via Cleopatra Records (2020)

=== Other appearances ===
- Taylor appears, dressed in drag, brandishing a rolling pin, midway through the Girlschool promotional video for their 1980 song "Yeah, Right".
- Classic Albums – Ace of Spades (DVD). Taylor is in interview and playing drums on several of the Ace of Spades albums classic tracks.
