= Motörhead discography =

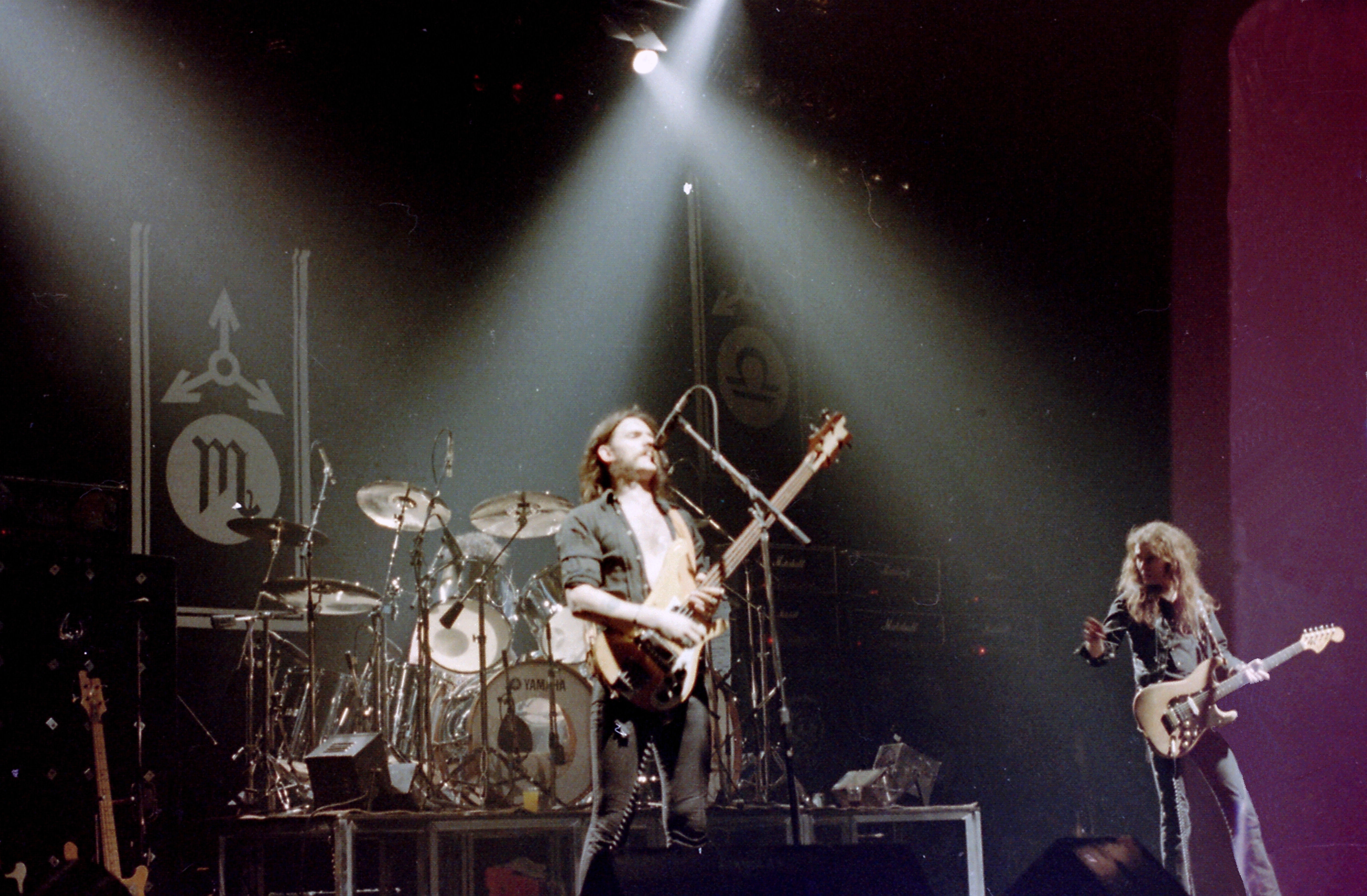
- Motörhead in 1982
- Studio albums: 23
- Extended plays: 5
- Live albums: 23
- Compilation albums: 16
- Singles: 29
- Video albums: 10
- Music videos: 34
- Box sets: 3

The discography of Motörhead, an English rock band, consists of 23 studio albums, 23 live albums, 16 compilation albums, five extended plays (EPs), three box sets, 29 singles, 10 video albums and 34 music videos. Motörhead were originally formed in 1975 in London by bassist and vocalist Ian "Lemmy" Kilmister, after his departure from Hawkwind, who drafted in guitarist Larry Wallis and drummer Lucas Fox (who was quickly replaced by Phil "Philthy Animal" Taylor) to complete the band's initial lineup. The trio recorded their debut album for release on United Artists, although it was not released until 1979 as On Parole. "Fast" Eddie Clarke joined the band as a second guitarist soon after this recording was completed, but as it was shelved by United Artists and even though On Parole is chronologically the band's first album, Clarke would instead replace Wallis who left soon after Clarke joined for unspecified reasons. It is this trio who would go on to record the band's first released album, the self-titled Motörhead, as a three-piece. Thus, beginning the band's classic line-up and initially issued by Chiswick Records in 1977 (as a favour to Lemmy), reaching number 43 on the UK Albums Chart.

In 1978, Motörhead signed with Bronze Records; their first releases on the label were Overkill and Bomber, both in 1979. The albums reached 24 and 12 respectively in the UK, and both spawned UK top 40 singles in "Overkill" and "Bomber". Motörhead improved further on their chart success with their next two studio albums, Ace of Spades and Iron Fist, which reached 4 and 6 respectively on the UK Albums Chart. In 1981 the group also achieved their first UK number one with their first live album, No Sleep 'til Hammersmith, which was supported by the release of a live recording of "Motörhead" which reached number six in the UK. The band also collaborated with Girlschool (as Headgirl) on the EP St. Valentine's Day Massacre, which reached number 5 in the UK. Clarke left the band in 1982.

Clarke was replaced by former Thin Lizzy guitarist Brian Robertson, who performed on the top-20 album Another Perfect Day. In 1984 Robertson was replaced by Phil Campbell and Michael "Würzel" Burston, while Taylor also left to be replaced by Pete Gill. The new four-piece released Orgasmatron in 1986, which reached number 21 in the UK, before Taylor returned to the band. Rock 'N' Roll and 1916 reached the UK top 40, before Taylor left again during the recording of March ör Die; Mikkey Dee was brought in as his replacement. The band's next three albums – Bastards, Sacrifice and Overnight Sensation – failed to chart in the UK. During the Sacrifice era Würzel left the band which made the band return to its roots as a three-piece line up which would last up until Lemmy's passing in 2015. In 1998, Snake Bite Love reached number 171. Later releases improved in chart success, with the band's album Bad Magic reaching number ten on the UK Albums Chart. By 2025, Motörhead had sold over 25 million albums worldwide.

== Albums ==
=== Studio albums ===
List of studio albums, with selected chart positions, sales figures and certifications
Title	Album details	Peak chart positions											Sales	Certifications
Title	Album details	UK	AUS	AUT	FIN	FRA	GER	NED	NOR	SWE	SWI	US	Sales	Certifications
Motörhead	Released: 12 August 1977; Label: Chiswick (#2); Format: LP	43	—	—	—	—	—	—	—	—	—	—		BPI: Silver
Overkill	Released: March 1979; Label: Bronze (#515); Formats: LP, CS	24	—	—	—	—	60	—	—	—	77	—		BPI: Silver
Bomber	Released: 12 October 1979; Label: Bronze (#523); Format: LP	12	—	—	—	—	97	—	—	—	—	—		BPI: Silver
On Parole	Released: 2 November 1979; Label: United Artists (#1004); Format: LP	65	—	—	—	—	—	—	—	—	—	—		
Ace of Spades	Released: October 1980; Label: Bronze (#531); Formats: LP, CS	4	—	42	—	—	10	—	37	—	39	201		BPI: Gold
Iron Fist	Released: April 1982; Label: Bronze (#539); Formats: LP, CS	6	80	75	—	—	15	26	4	25	26	174		BPI: Silver
Another Perfect Day	Released: May 1983; Label: Bronze (#546); Formats: LP, CS	20	89	30	—	—	24	39	—	18	39	153		
Orgasmatron	Released: 21 July 1986; Label: GWR (#1); Formats: CD, LP, CS	21	86	44	—	—	47	69	—	32	33	157		
Rock 'n' Roll	Released: 17 August 1987; Label: GWR (#14); Formats: CD, LP, CS	34	99	—	—	—	33	69	—	41	—	150		
1916	Released: 21 January 1991; Label: Epic (#467481); Formats: CD, LP, CS	24	95	—	—	—	14	—	—	23	24	142		
March ör Die	Released: 27 July 1992; Label: Epic (#471723); Formats: CD, LP, CS	60	—	16	—	—	21	—	—	42	18	—		
Bastards	Released: 11 October 1993; Label: ZYX (#20263); Formats: CD, LP	—	—	—	—	—	28	—	—	48	—	—		
Sacrifice	Released: 27 March 1995; Label: Steamhammer (#7694); Formats: CD, LP	—	—	—	—	—	31	—	—	36	—	—		
Overnight Sensation	Released: 15 October 1996; Label: Steamhammer (#1830); Formats: CD, LP	—	—	—	39	—	70	—	—	60	—	—		
Snake Bite Love	Released: 10 March 1998; Label: Steamhammer (#1889); Formats: CD, LP	171	—	—	—	—	47	—	—	49	—	—		
We Are Motörhead	Released: 16 May 2000; Label: Steamhammer (#2182); Formats: CD, LP	91	—	—	39	—	21	—	—	33	—	—	US: 5,900	
Hammered	Released: 9 April 2002; Label: Steamhammer (#7406); Formats: CD, LP	113	—	—	34	113	39	—	—	18	—	—	US: 12,900	
Inferno	Released: 22 June 2004; Label: Steamhammer (#6974); Formats: CD, LP	95	—	44	17	58	10	—	—	34	36	—	US: 3,100	
Kiss of Death	Released: 29 August 2006; Label: Steamhammer (#9991); Formats: CD, LP, DL	45	—	20	16	37	4	64	9	13	26	—		
Motörizer	Released: 26 August 2008; Label: Steamhammer (#9163); Formats: CD, LP, DL	32	—	13	9	24	5	58	11	10	11	82		
The Wörld Is Yours	Released: 14 December 2010; Label: UDR/EMI (#0001/2/3); Formats: CD, CD+DVD, LP, DL	45	—	34	15	89	25	—	40	24	24	94		
Aftershock	Released: 21 October 2013; Label: UDR (#0175/6/7); Formats: CD, CD+DVD, LP, DL	115	—	7	5	14	5	64	6	8	6	22		BVMI: Gold
Bad Magic	Released: 28 August 2015; Label: UDR (#057); Formats: CD, LP, DL	10	—	1	1	16	1	7	7	4	2	35		BVMI: Gold

=== Live albums ===
List of live albums, with selected chart positions, sales figures and certifications
Title	Album details	Peak chart positions						Certifications
Title	Album details	UK	FRA	GER	NOR	NZ	SWE	Certifications
No Sleep 'til Hammersmith	Released: June 1981; Label: Bronze (#535); Formats: LP, CS	1	—	4	24	28	27	BPI: Gold
What's Words Worth? (recorded 1978)	Released: February 1983; Label: Big Beat (#2); Formats: LP, CS	71	—	—	—	—	—	
Nö Sleep at All	Released: October 1988; Label: GWR (#31); Formats: CD, LP, CS	79	59	—	—	—	—	
Blitzkrieg on Birmingham '77	Released: November 1989; Label: Receiver (#120); Format: CD	—	—	—	—	—	—	
Lock Up Your Daughters 1978	Released: July 1990; Label: Receiver (#130); Format: CD	—	—	—	—	—	—	
Live at Brixton '87	Released: 28 March 1994; Label: Roadrunner (#9009); Formats: CD, LP, CS	—	—	—	—	—	—	
Everything Louder than Everyone Else (live on 21 May 1998 at The Docks, Hamburg, Germany)	Released: 9 March 1999; Label: Steamhammer (#068); Format: 2CD, 3LP	—	—	—	—	—	—	
25 & Alive: Live at Brixton Academy	Released: 9 December 2003; Label: Steamhammer (#7262); Format: 2CD	—	—	—	—	—	—	
BBC Live & In-Session	Released: 20 September 2005; Label: Sanctuary; Format: 2CD, 2 x 2LP	—	—	—	—	—	—	
Better Motörhead than Dead: Live at Hammersmith	Released: 16 July 2007; Label: Steamhammer (#9817); Formats: 2CD, 4LP	—	176	—	—	—	—	
The Wörld Is Ours - Vol. 1: Everywhere Further Than Everyplace Else	Released: 22 November 2011; Label: UDR (#0078); Formats: 2CD+DVD, 2LP	—	—	51	—	—	—	
The Wörld Is Ours – Vol. 2: Anyplace Crazy as Anywhere Else	Released: 2 October 2012; Label: UDR (#0125); Formats: 2CD+DVD, 2LP	—	—	44	—	—	—	
Clean Your Clock	Released: 10 June 2016; Label: UDR; Formats: CD+DVD/Blu-ray, 2LP	36	77	2	18	—	—	
Louder Than Noise... Live in Berlin (Live on 5 December 2012 at the Velodrom, Berlin, Germany)	Released: 23 April 2021; Label: Silver Lining Music; Formats: CD+DVD, 2LP	—	128	4	—	—	—	
The Löst Tapes Vol. 1 (Live In Madrid 1995) (Live on 1 June 1995 at Sala Aqualung, Madrid, Spain)	Released: 8 May 2021; Format: only digital (24 FLAC files / 24 (320 kbps) mp3 files); Released: 26 November 2021; Format: 2LP (red vinyl) "RSD Exclusive" (limited edition: only 3,500 copies); Label: BMG	—	—	—	—	—	—	
The Löst Tapes Vol. 2 (Live In Norwich 1998) (Live on 18 October 1998 at the University of East Anglia, Norwich, England, UK)	Released: 24 December 2021; Format: only digital (22 FLAC files / 22 (320 kbps) mp3 files); Released: 23 April 2022; Format: 2LP (blue transparent vinyl) "RSD Exclusive" (limited edition: only 2,250 copies); Label: BMG	—	—	—	—	—	—	
The Löst Tapes Vol. 3 (Live in Malmö 2000) (Live on 17 November 2000 at KB Hallen, Malmö, Sweden)	Released: 8 May 2022; Format: digital (21 FLAC files / 21 (320 kbps) mp3 files); Released: 25 November 2022; Format: 2LP (green translucent vinyl) "RSD Exclusive" (limited edition) (limited edition: only 2,600 copies); Label: BMG	—	—	—	—	—	—	
The Löst Tapes Vol. 4 (Live In Heilbronn Christmas Metal Meeting 84) (Live on 29 December 1984 at Sporthalle, Heilbronn, Germany)	Released: 24 December 2022; Format: digital (19 FLAC files / 19 (320 kbps) mp3 files); Released: 22 April 2023; Format: 2LP (amber transparent vinyl) "RSD Exclusive" (limited edition: only 2,250 copies); Label: BMG	—	—	—	—	—	—	
We Play Rock 'N' Roll • Live at Montreux Jazz Festival ‘07 (Live on 07/07/07 at Montreux Jazz Festival, Montreux, Switzerland)	Released: 16 June 2023; Format: CD, vinyl & digital; Label: BMG	—	—	—	—	—	—	
The Löst Tapes Vol. 5 (Live At Donington Download Fest '08) (Live on 13 June 2008 at Download Festival, Donington, UK)	Released: 24 December 2023; Format: digital (14 AAC files, 256 kbps); Label: BMG; Released: 23 February 2024; Format: 2LP (yellow transparent vinyl); Label: BMG	—	—	46	—	—	—	
The Löst Tapes Vol. 6 (Live in Berlin 1992) (Live on 24 December 1992 at Eissporthalle, Berlin, Germany)	Released: 24 December 2024; Format: digital (17 AAC files, 256 kbps); Label: Sanctuary Records; Released: April 12, 2025; Format: 2LP (purple transparent vinyl); Label: BMG	—	—	—	—	—	—	
The Löst Tapes Vol. 7 (Lemmy's 50th Birthday, Live In West Hollywood, 1995) (Live on 14 December 1995 at Whisky a Go Go, Los Angeles, CA)	Released: 24 December 2025; Format: digital (16 MP3 files, 320 kbps & 16 FLAC files); Label: BMG Rights Management (UK) Limited; Released: April 18, 2026 (RSD); Format: 2LP (crystal clear vinyl)	—	—	—	—	—	—	
The Löst Tapes Vol. 8 (Live at Winter Gardens, Margate, Nov. 5th, 1984) (Note: This performance features a rare early three-piece line-up of Lemmy, Pete Gill (on drums) and the newly recruited Phil Campbell (on guitar), recorded while guitarist Würzel was hospitalised in Newcastle with a kidney illness..)	Released: 8 May 2026; Format: digital (18 (48 kHz / 24-bit) AIFF files / 18 FLAC audio files); Label: BMG Rights Management (UK) Limited	—	—	—	—	—	—	
"—" denotes a release that did not chart or was not issued in that territory.

=== Compilation albums ===
List of compilation albums, with selected chart positions, sales figures and certifications
Title	Album details	Peak positions			Certifications
Title	Album details	UK	FIN	GER	Certifications
No Remorse	Released: 7 September 1984; Label: Bronze (#5); Formats: 2LP, CS	14	—	—	BPI: Silver
Anthology	Released: April 1986; Label: Castle; Formats: CD, CS	—	—	—	
Welcome to the Bear Trap	Released: April 1990; Label: Castle Records; Formats: CD, 2LP	—	—	—	
Meltdown	Released: 1991; Label: Castle; Formats: 3 CD	—	—	—	
The Best of Motörhead	Released: 6 July 1993; Label: Roadrunner (#9056); Format: CD	—	—	—	
All the Aces	Released: November 1993; Label: Castle (#125); Formats: CD, 2LP, CS	—	—	—	
Protect the Innocent	Released: 25 August 1997; Label: Castle (#562); Format: 4CD	—	—	—	
Deaf Forever: The Best of Motörhead	Released: 8 August 2000; Label: Castle (#502); Format: CD	—	—	—	
The Best Of	Released: 28 August 2000; Label: Metal-is (#002); Formats: 2CD, 3LP	52	30	97	BPI: Silver
Over the Top: The Rarities	Released: 26 September 2000; Label: Sanctuary (#176); Format: CD	—	—	—	
No Class	Released: 2001; Label: Castle Pie(#PIESD268); Format: CD	—	—	—	
Tear Ya Down: The Rarities	Released: 7 May 2002; Label: Castle (#444); Format: 2CD	—	—	—	
Hellraiser: Best of the Epic Years	Released: 17 March 2003; Label: Sony; Format: CD	—	49	—	
The Essential Motörhead	Released: 2007; Label: Metro Doubles; Format: 2 CD	—	—	—	
You'll Get Yours: The Best of Motörhead	Released: 4 October 2010; Label: Sanctuary; Format: 1 CD	—	—	—	
Under Cöver	Released: 2017; Label: WEA; Format: 1 CD	19	13	4	
Everything Louder Forever – The Very Best of Motörhead	Released: 29 October 2021; Label: BMG; Format: 2CD/2LP/Deluxe 4LP	18	31	6	BPI: Silver
The Manticore Tapes	Released: 27 June 2025; Label: Sanctuary, BMG Rights Management; Formats: CD, LP, DL	62	34	9	
Killed By Deaf	Released: 2025; Label: Format:	—	—	—	
"—" denotes a release that did not chart or was not issued in that territory.

=== Box sets ===
List of Box Sets albums, with selected chart positions, sales figures and certifications
Title	Album details	Peak positions		
Title	Album details	UK	FIN	GER
Stone Deaf Forever!	Released: 7 October 2003; Label: Castle; Format: 5CD	—	—	—
End of the Wörld	Released: 7 December 2018; Label: Silver Lining Music; Format: 8CD	—	—	—
1979	Released: 25 October 2019; Label: Silver Lining Music; Format: 7x 12" LP, 1x 7" single	—	—	44
The Löst Tapes - The Collection Volumes 1-5	Released: 23 February 2024; Label: BMG; Format: 8CD / 97 tracks	—	—	—
We Take No Prisoners (The Singles 1995–2006)	Released: 25 October 2024; Label: BMG; Format: 9x 7" singles (18 tracks), expanded double CD & digital editions (19 tracks)	—	—	40
"—" denotes a release that did not chart or was not issued in that territory.

== Extended plays ==
List of extended plays, with selected chart positions, sales figures and certifications
Title	EP details	Peaks	Certifications
Title	EP details	UK	Certifications
The Golden Years: Live EP	Released: April 1980; Label: Bronze (#90); Formats: 7" vinyl, 12" vinyl	8	
Beer Drinkers and Hell Raisers	Released: 14 November 1980; Label: Big Beat (#61); Formats: 7" vinyl, 12" vinyl	43	
St. Valentine's Day Massacre (with Girlschool as Headgirl)	Released: 13 February 1981; Label: Bronze (#116); Formats: 7" vinyl, 10" vinyl	5	BPI: Gold
Stand by Your Man (Lemmy with Wendy O. Williams)	Released: 1982; Label: Bronze; Formats: 12" vinyl	—	
'92 Tour EP	Released: 2 November 1992; Label: Epic (#658809); Formats: CD, 12" vinyl	63	
Enter Sandman EP	Released: 8 May 2023; Label: Sanctuary; Formats: Download	—	
"—" denotes a release that did not chart or was not issued in that territory.

== Singles ==
List of singles, with selected chart positions and certifications, showing year released and album name
Title	Year	Peaks				Certifications	Album
Title	Year	UK	NZ	GER	US Rock	Certifications	Album
"Leaving Here"	1977	—	—	—	—		Non-album single
"Motörhead" (Note: Chart position is from the official UK "Breakers List".)	1977	52	—	—	—		Motörhead
"Louie Louie"	1978	68	—	—	—		Non-album single
"Overkill"	1979	39	—	—	—		Overkill
"No Class"	1979	61	—	—	—		Overkill
"Bomber"	1979	34	—	—	—		Bomber
"Ace of Spades"	1980	15	—	—	—	BPI: Platinum	Ace of Spades
"The Train Kept A-Rollin'" (live)	1981	—	—	—	—		The Flexipop Album
"Motörhead" (live)	1981	6	33	—	—		No Sleep 'til Hammersmith
"Iron Fist"	1982	29	—	—	—		Iron Fist
"Go to Hell"	1982	—	—	—	—		Iron Fist
"I Got Mine"	1983	46	—	—	—		Another Perfect Day
"Shine"	1983	59	—	—	—		Another Perfect Day
"Killed by Death"	1984	51	—	—	—		No Remorse
"Deaf Forever"	1986	67	—	—	—		Orgasmatron
"Eat the Rich"	1987	—	—	—	—		Rock 'N' Roll
"Live in Athens"	1988	—	—	—	—		Non-album single
"The One to Sing the Blues"	1990	45	—	—	—		1916
"Hellraiser"	1992	—	—	—	—		March ör Die
"Don't Let Daddy Kiss Me"	1993	—	—	—	—		Bastards
"Born to Raise Hell" (featuring Ice-T and Whitfield Crane)	1994	47	—	—	—		Bastards
"I Don't Believe a Word"	1996	—	—	—	—		Overnight Sensation
"God Save the Queen"	2000	93	—	—	—		We Are Motörhead
"We Are Motörhead"	2000	—	—	—	—		We Are Motörhead
"Kingdom of the Worm"	2006	—	—	—	—		Kiss of Death
"Rock Out"	2008	—	—	—	—		Motörizer
"Get Back in Line"	2010	—	—	—	—		The Wörld Is Yours
"I Know How to Die"	2011	—	—	—	—		The Wörld Is Yours
"Crying Shame"	2013	—	—	—	—		Aftershock
"Thunder & Lightning" / "Electricity"	2015	—	—	—	—		Bad Magic
"Ace of Spades" (reissue)	2016	13	—	96	12		Ace of Spades
"Get Back in Line" (VideoVinyl)	2018	—	—	—	—		The Wörld Is Yours
"—" denotes a release that did not chart or was not issued in that territory.

== Videos ==
=== Video albums ===
List of video albums
Title	Album details
Live in Toronto	Released: 1982; Label: Castle Hendring (#5037); Format: VHS, LD
Deaf Not Blind	Released: 1984; Label: Virgin (#005); Format: VHS, LD
The Birthday Party	Released: 1985; Label: Virgin (#821424); Format: VHS, LD
Another Perfect Day EP	Released: 1985; Label: PolyGram (#052); Formats: VHS, LD
Motörhead Live: Everything Löuder than Everything Else	Released: 15 July 1991; Label: Sony (#200730); Format: VHS, LD
The Best of Motörhead	Released: 1991; Label: Castle; Format: VHS, LD
25 & Alive Boneshaker	Released: 13 November 2001; Label: Steamhammer (#7279); Format: DVD
Special Edition EP	Released: 2002; Label: Classicpictures (DVD7012X); Format: DVD
Classic Albums: Ace of Spades	Released: 27 June 2005; Label: Eagle Vision (EREDV437); Format: DVD
Stage Fright (Live on 7 December 2004 in Düsseldorf, Germany)	Released: 18 July 2005; Label: Steamhammer (#99287); Format: 2DVD

=== Music videos ===
List of music videos, showing year released and director(s)
Title	Year	Director(s)	Background/Synopsis	Ref.
"Motörhead"	1977	Keith "Marcus Keef" MacMillan	live footage	
"Overkill"	1979	Keith "Marcus Keef" MacMillan	live footage	
"No Class"	1979	Keith "Marcus Keef" MacMillan	live footage	
"Capricorn"	1979	Keith "Marcus Keef" MacMillan	live footage	
"Stay Clean"	1979	Keith "Marcus Keef" MacMillan	live footage	
"Bomber"	1979	Keith "Marcus Keef" MacMillan	live footage	
"Dead Men Tell No Tales"	1979	Keith "Marcus Keef" MacMillan	live footage	
"Poison"	1979	Keith "Marcus Keef" MacMillan	live footage	
"Ace of Spades"	1980	Keith "Marcus Keef" MacMillan	live footage	
"The Chase Is Better than the Catch"	1980	Keith "Marcus Keef" MacMillan	live footage	
"Please Don't Touch" (with Girlschool as Headgirl)	1981	unknown	live footage	
"Iron Fist"	1982	Keith "Marcus Keef" MacMillan	live footage	
"One Track Mind"	1983	Keith "Marcus Keef" MacMillan	live footage	
"Shine"	1983	Keith "Marcus Keef" MacMillan	live footage	
"I Got Mine"	1983	Keith "Marcus Keef" MacMillan	live footage	
"Killed by Death"	1984	Rod Swenson	Lemmy fetches a young woman from her oppressive parent's home on a motorcycle by breaking through the wall. He takes her to a wild rock concert which is brutally intercepted by police. He is put to death on an electric chair and mourned over by her.	
"Eat the Rich"	1987	unknown	Scenes from the same-titled movie, intersected by band footage	
"I'm So Bad (Baby I Don't Care)"	1991	Steve Taylor	mostly live footage	
"I Ain't No Nice Guy" (featuring Ozzy Osbourne and Slash)	1992	Michael Brillantes	video clip	
"Hellraiser"	1992	Clive Barker	live footage mixed with scenes from Hellraiser movie	
"Burner"	1993	Jefferson Spady	mostly live footage	
"Born to Raise Hell" (featuring Ice-T and Whitfield Crane)	1994	Paul Rachman	The band invades a movie theater and, in front of the destroyed screen, plays a concert which ends in a small riot.	
"Sacrifice"	1995	unknown	Video clip including stock footage, mostly of World War II	
"I Don't Believe a Word"	1996	unknown	live footage	
"God Save the Queen"	2000	Vanessa Warwick, Justin B. Murphy	The band plays on a double-decker bus driving through London, as well as a club show, in company of the queen.	
"Brave New World"	2002	Stefan Browatzki	Footage of perceived wrongs of the world, as drug abuse, homelessness, poverty, neglect of children and war, in contrast to politicians, church leaders and high society.	
"Serial Killer"	2002	unknown	Lemmy is shown reciting the poem, with him being executed on an electric chair in the end.	
"Life's a Bitch"	2004	unknown	The band members play arms dealers residing in a car parlor, guarded by women with assault rifles. Mixed with live footage.	
"Whorehouse Blues"	2005	Geraldine Geraghty	The band, as well as a group of exotic dancers, get ready in their backstage rooms and move forwards to the main room of a strip club, where they put on a show for the patrons.	
"Be My Baby"	2006	unknown	live footage	
"Rock Out"	2008	Greg Olliver, Wes Orshoski	The video depicts different Motörhead fans and how they live out the music.	
"Get Back in Line"	2010	Geraldine Geraghty	The band roughs up a gluttonous high society poker game. Mixed with footage of the band playing on a London roof top with view on St Paul's Cathedral. The video also appears on VideoVinyl in a special 2018 release on the Sounds of Subterrania label.	.
"I Know How to Die"	2011	unknown	live footage from The Wörld Is Ours tour	
"Heartbreaker"	2013	Geraldine Geraghty, Martin Hawkes	An artist is depicted developing artwork, originally sketched by Lemmy, for the video, while watching Motörhead live footage, which was also used in the video.	
"Lost Woman Blues"	2014	unknown	Live version with live, backstage and fan footage	
"Electricity"	2015		lyric video	
"When the Sky Comes Looking for You"	2015	Pep Bonet	After killing a hitch hiker with his mental powers, a mysterious biker visits a roadside rocker club where he finishes off cheating regulars at a poker game.	
"Ripsaw Teardown"	2022	Nick Mead	Filmed at Allan Ballard’s Hertfordshire home. Video material used occasionally on the Iron Fist tour.	
"Greedy Bastards"	2023	Natalia Jonderko Śmiechowicz	Bonus track from the 2023 re-release of Bad Magic. Animated video.	

== Other appearances ==
List of other appearances, showing year released and album name
Title	Year	Album	Ref.
"Hell on Earth"	1992	Hellraiser III: Hell on Earth	
"The Game"	2001	WWF The Music, Vol. 5	
"Shoot 'Em Down"	2001	Twisted Forever	
"Bomber" (live)	2003	Wacken Metal Overdrive	
"No Class" (live)	2003	Wacken Metal Overdrive	
"Whiplash"	2004	Metallic Attack: The Ultimate Tribute	
"You Better Swim"	2004	The SpongeBob SquarePants Movie	
"Line in the Sand"	2004	ThemeAddict: WWE The Music, Vol. 6	
"Civil War"	2005	Armageddon Over Wacken: Live 2004	
"Life's a Bitch"	2005	Armageddon Over Wacken: Live 2004	
"Metropolis"	2005	Armageddon Over Wacken: Live 2004	
"We Are Motörhead"	2005	Armageddon Over Wacken: Live 2004	
"Stay Clean" (live)	2006	Bang Your Head!!! Festival 2005	
"Dr. Rock" (live)	2006	Bang Your Head!!! Festival Best Of	
"King of Kings"	2006	WWE Wreckless Intent	
"In the Name of Tragedy" (live)	2007	Live at Wacken 2006	
"Killers" (live)	2007	Live at Wacken 2006	
"Breaking the Law"	2008	Hell Bent Forever: A Tribute to Judas Priest	
"Killed by Death" (live)	2010	Live at Wacken 2009	
"Overkill" (live)	2010	Live at Wacken 2009	
"Damage Case" (live)	2014	Live at Wacken 2013	
"Metropolis" (live)	2014	Live at Wacken 2013	
"Starstruck"	2014	Ronnie James Dio: This Is Your Life	
