= List of Motörhead band members =

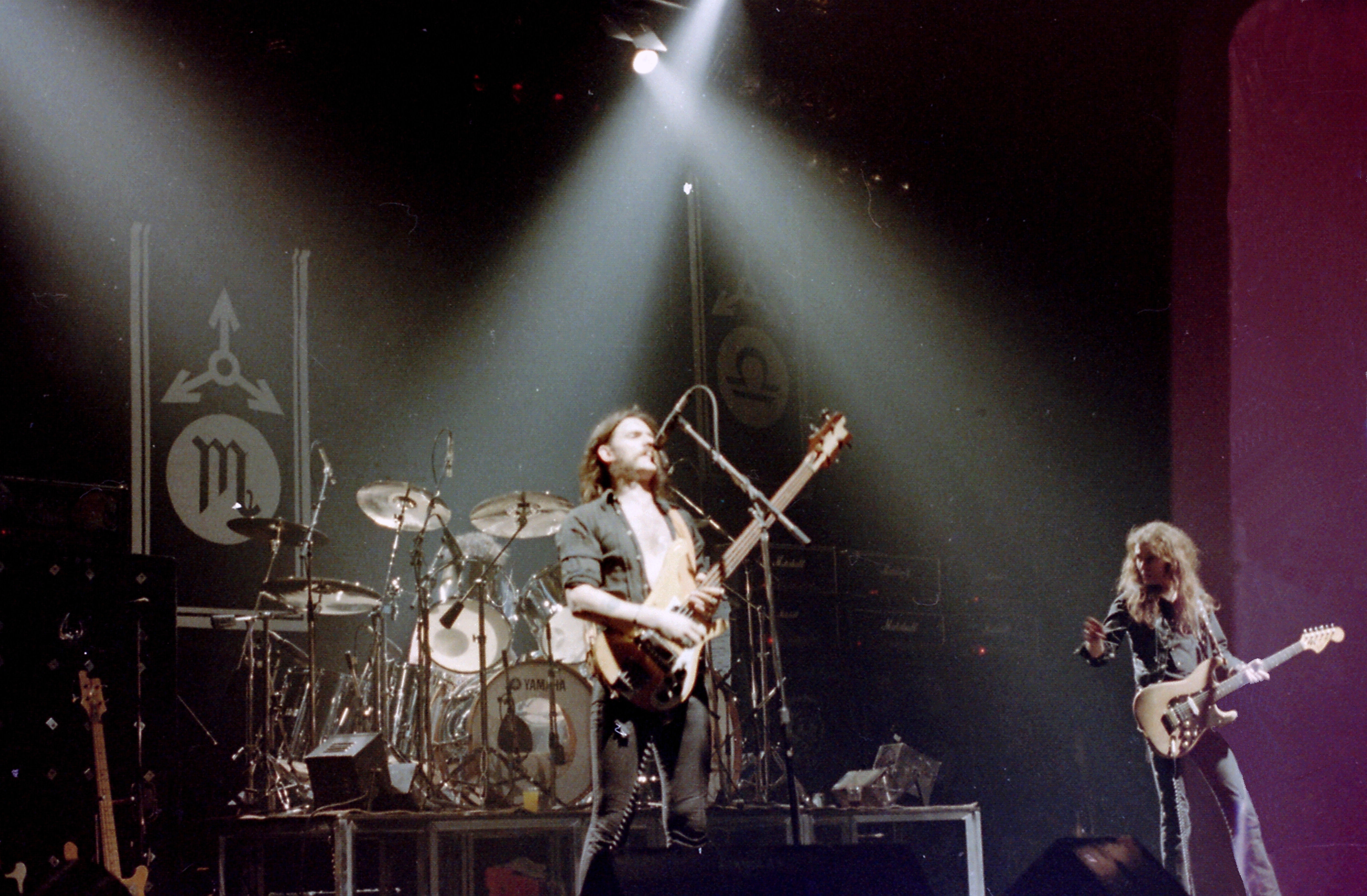
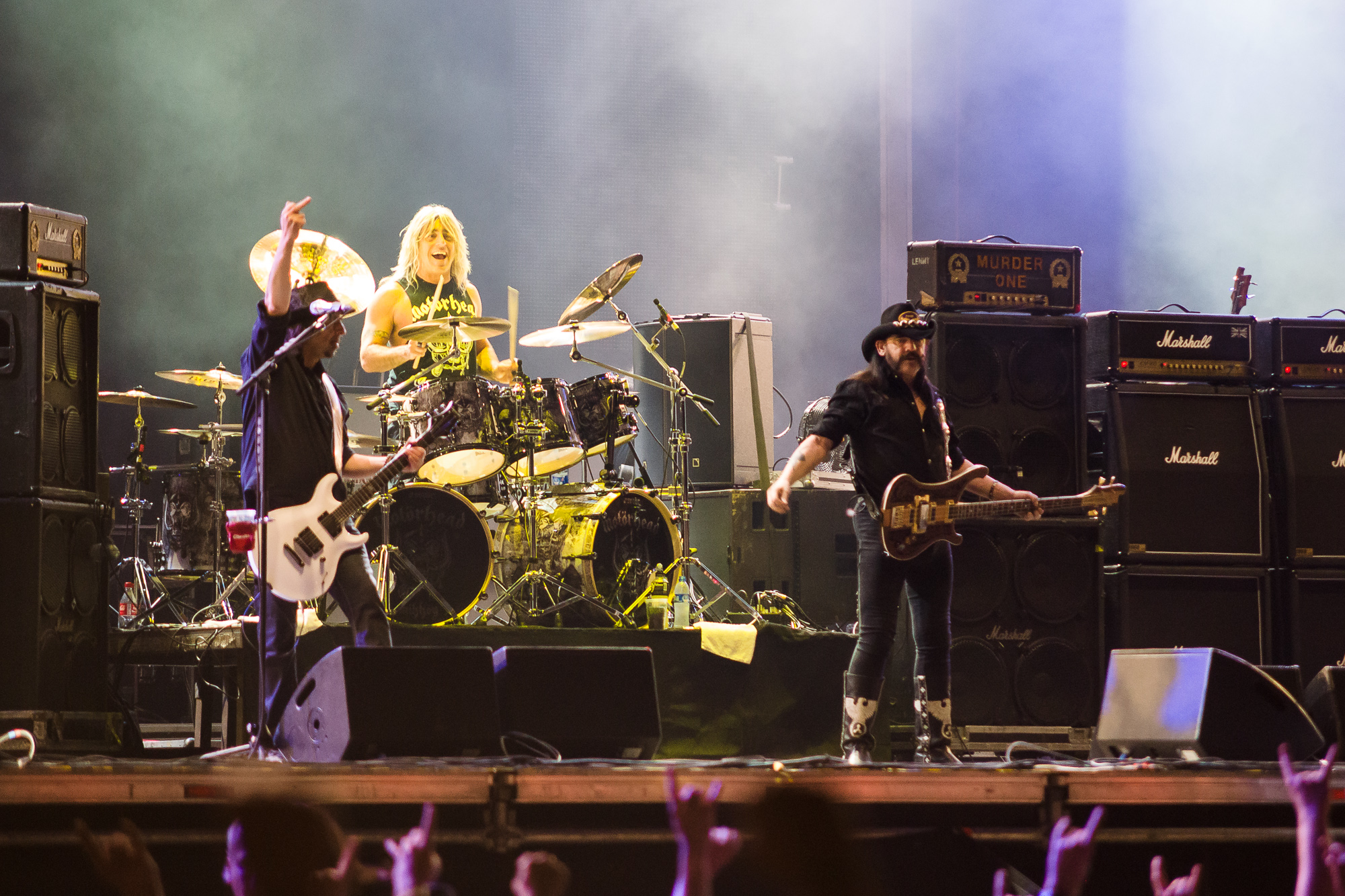
Two lineups of Motörhead performing live in 1982 (top) and 2013 (bottom).

Motörhead were an English heavy metal band from London. Formed in 1975, the group originally featured former Hawkwind bassist and vocalist Ian "Lemmy" Kilmister, former Pink Fairies guitarist and vocalist Larry Wallis, and drummer Lucas Fox. The band went through several lineup changes, before settling on its final incarnation of Lemmy, guitarist Phil Campbell and drummer Mikkey Dee in 1995. Motörhead disbanded upon Lemmy's death on 28 December 2015.

== History ==
=== 1975–1982 ===
Bassist and vocalist Ian "Lemmy" Kilmister was sacked from space rock group Hawkwind in May 1975, after he was arrested for suspected possession of cocaine (later determined to be amphetamines) during a North American concert tour. After moving back to London, Lemmy quickly formed Motörhead (named after the final song he wrote for Hawkwind) with guitarist Larry Wallis and drummer Lucas Fox. By December, Fox had been replaced by Phil "Philthy Animal" Taylor after his performances had been deemed "unreliable" during early recording sessions. Taylor re-recorded all songs the band had tracked earlier (with the exception of "Lost Johnny", following an arrest which prevented him from being able to get to the studio in time), which were later issued in 1979 as On Parole.

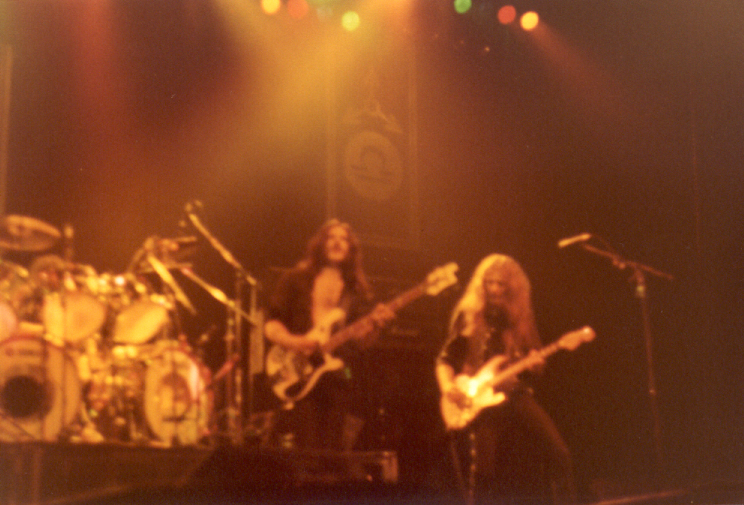
The 1976–82 lineup of Lemmy, Eddie Clarke and Phil Taylor became known as the "classic lineup" of the band.

In March 1976, Motörhead auditioned "Fast" Eddie Clarke, a friend of Taylor's, as an intended second guitarist; however, after rehearsing just one song as a four-piece, Wallis decided to leave and Clarke took over as the sole guitarist. The lineup of Lemmy, Clarke and Taylor became known as the "classic Motörhead lineup", releasing five successful studio albums between 1977 and 1982 including Ace of Spades. Prior to any of these releases, however, the group almost broke up in April 1977 due to poor reviews of their live shows and little to no interest from record companies. They remained together though, and their self-titled debut album followed in August.

=== 1982–1995 ===
After a string of successful releases, Clarke left Motörhead in May 1982 due to his disapproval with the recording of the EP Stand by Your Man with singer Wendy O. Williams. His place was soon taken by former Thin Lizzy guitarist Brian "Robbo" Robertson, initially to complete the touring cycle, after which he accepted a full-time role with the band. Robertson only remained for a year and a half, however, playing his last show on 11 November 1983 before leaving the band. In subsequent interviews, Lemmy claimed that working with Robertson on Another Perfect Day as "fucking torture", as well as criticising him for "dress[ing] like a cunt" on stage.

Motörhead became a quartet at the beginning of 1984, when both Michael "Würzel" Burston and Phil "Wizzö" Campbell were hired to take over Robertson's place in the band, following a string of auditions. The new lineup recorded a new version of "Ace of Spades" for the TV series The Young Ones in February, after which Taylor also left the band. He was replaced by Pete Gill, formerly of Saxon. After recording four new tracks for the No Remorse compilation and issuing one full-length album, Orgasmatron, Phil Taylor returned to Motörhead in March 1987 to replace Gill, who left "by mutual agreement ... for business reasons". Lemmy would later claim that Gill had tried to get him fired from Motörhead.

With "Philthy Animal" Taylor back on drums, Motörhead released Rock 'n' Roll in 1987 and 1916 in 1991. After recording just one song for the band's 1992 follow-up March ör Die, however, he was fired, with Lemmy later explaining that "I would never have fired Phil if he had been pulling his weight, but he wasn't, and I couldn't make him do it." Much of the rest of the album's recording was completed by session drummer Tommy Aldridge, most recently departed from Whitesnake.

=== 1995–2015 ===
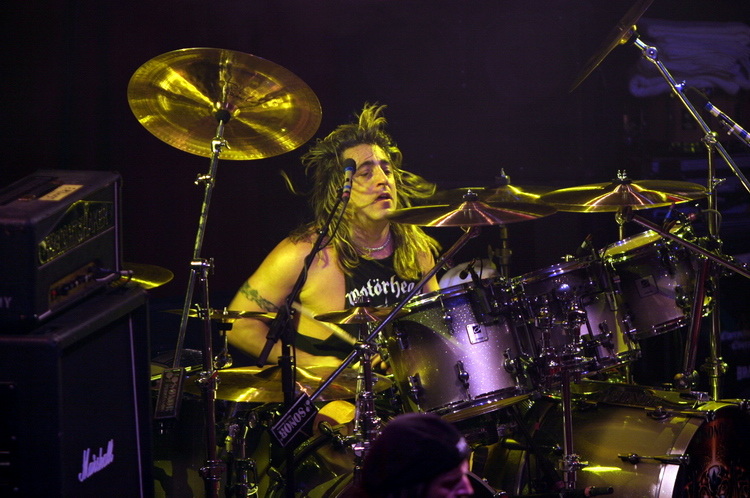
Mikkey Dee took over as Motörhead's drummer in 1992 and remained with the band until Lemmy's death in 2015.

Towards the end of sessions for March ör Die, former King Diamond drummer Mikkey Dee was brought in to take over from Phil Taylor, initially on a temporary basis but soon as a permanent replacement. He featured only on the album's lead single, "Hellraiser". With Dee in place, Bastards and Sacrifice followed in quick succession. After the recording of the latter finished in early 1995, Motörhead went through its final lineup change when guitarist Würzel left the band, which Lemmy claimed "became clearer every day" during the sessions. Following his departure, Würzel was not replaced and Motörhead returned to their "classic" three-piece setup.

The lineup of Lemmy, Phil Campbell and Mikkey Dee remained constant from 1995 to 2015, the longest in the band's history. During summer 2003, Campbell was substituted at two shows by former Danzig guitarist Todd Youth after his mother had died, before joining him for a third date and performing as a four-piece. In September 2009, former Guns N' Roses and Velvet Revolver drummer Matt Sorum filled in for Dee, who took part in the Swedish TV show Kändisdjungeln. Lemmy later cited a "breakdown in communication" as the reason for Dee's absence, explaining that "Our management didn't know that he'd signed up for this when they booked the tour."

On 28 December 2015, Lemmy died of what was later revealed to be prostate cancer, cardiac arrhythmia and congestive heart failure. The next day, Mikkey Dee confirmed that "Motörhead is over, of course," adding that "Lemmy was Motörhead." Several other former members of the band have also died – Michael "Würzel" Burston on 9 July 2011, Phil "Philthy Animal" Taylor on 11 November 2015, "Fast" Eddie Clarke on 10 January 2018, and Larry Wallis on 19 September 2019.

== Members ==
=== Official ===
Image	Name	Years active	Instruments	Release contributions
	Ian "Lemmy" Kilmister	1975–2015 (until his death)	lead vocals; bass; occasional lead and acoustic guitar and harmonica	all Motörhead releases
	Larry Wallis	1975–1976 (died 2019)	guitar; backing and occasional lead vocals	On Parole (1979)
	Lucas Fox	1975	drums	On Parole (1979) – one track only, "Lost Johnny"; The Birthday Party (1986) – guest appearance on one track, "Motorhead"
	Phil "Philthy Animal" Taylor	1975–1984; 1987–1992; guest 2014 (died 2015)	drums	all Motörhead releases from Motörhead (1977) to Another Perfect Day (1983) (except St. Valentine's Day Massacre), and from Rock 'n' Roll (1987) to March ör Die (1992); The Birthday Party (1986) – guest appearance on one track only; Live at Brixton '87 (1994); BBC Live & In-Session (2005)
	"Fast" Eddie Clarke	1976–1982; guest 2014 (died 2018)	guitar; backing and occasional lead vocals	all Motörhead releases from Motörhead (1977) to What's Words Worth? (1983) (except On Parole); The Birthday Party (1986) – guest appearance on one track only; Blitzkrieg on Birmingham '77 (1989); Lock Up Your Daughters 1978 (1990); Live at Brixton Academy (2003) – guest appearance on two tracks; BBC Live & In-Session (2005)
	Brian "Robbo" Robertson	1982–1983	guitar; backing vocals; occasional piano and keyboards	Another Perfect Day (1983); The Birthday Party (1986) – guest appearance on one track only"
	Phil "Zööm/Wizzö" Campbell	1984–2015 (died 2026)	guitar; backing vocals; occasional piano and keyboards	all Motörhead releases from No Remorse (1984) onwards
	Michael "Würzel" Burston	1984–1995 (died 2011)	guitar; backing vocals	all Motörhead releases from No Remorse (1984) to Sacrifice (1995); BBC Live & In-Session (2005)
	Pete Gill	1984–1987	drums	No Remorse (1984); The Birthday Party (1986); Orgasmatron (1986); BBC Live & In-Session (2005)
	Mikkey Dee	1992–2015	drums; occasional acoustic guitar	all Motörhead releases from March ör Die (1992) onwards (except Live at Brixton '87 and BBC Live & In-Session)

=== Backup ===
Image	Name	Years active	Instruments	Details
	Garry Bowler	1992 (session)	drums	Bowler recorded a number of demos with guitarists Würzel and Phil Campbell in February 1992, and was asked to join the band, but was unable to join due to the civil unrest in Los Angeles (where Motorhead's next album was to be recorded) following the Rodney King verdict.
	Tommy Aldridge	1992 (session)	drums	Following the departure of Phil Taylor, Aldridge performed drums on the majority of 1992's March ör Die.
	Todd Youth	2003 (touring) (died 2018)	guitar	Youth stood in for Campbell at several dates in the summer of 2003, after the guitarist's mother died.
	Matt Sorum	2009 (touring)	drums	Sorum filled in for Mikkey Dee on a September 2009 tour, as the drummer took part in Kändisdjungeln.

== Lineups ==
Period	Members	Releases
June – December 1975	Lemmy Kilmister – bass, lead vocals; Larry Wallis – guitars, vocals; Lucas Fox – drums	On Parole (1979) – one track only
December 1975 – March 1976	Lemmy Kilmister – bass, lead vocals; Larry Wallis – guitars, vocals; Phil "Philthy Animal" Taylor – drums	On Parole (1979) – remaining tracks
March 1976	Lemmy Kilmister – bass, lead vocals; Larry Wallis – guitars, backing vocals; Phil "Philthy Animal" Taylor – drums; "Fast" Eddie Clarke – guitars, backing vocals	none – one rehearsal
March 1976 – May 1982	Lemmy Kilmister – bass, lead vocals; Phil "Philthy Animal" Taylor – drums; "Fast" Eddie Clarke – guitars, vocals	"Leaving Here" (1977); Motörhead (1977); "Louie Louie" (1978); Overkill (1979); Bomber (1979); The Golden Years (1980); Ace of Spades (1980); Beer Drinkers and Hell Raisers (1980); St. Valentine's Day Massacre (1981); No Sleep 'til Hammersmith (1981); Iron Fist (1982); Live in Toronto (1982); What's Words Worth? (1983); Blitzkrieg on Birmingham '77 (1989); Lock Up Your Daughters 1978 (1990); BBC Live & In-Session (2005)
May 1982 – November 1983	Lemmy Kilmister – bass, lead vocals; Phil "Philthy Animal" Taylor – drums; Brian "Robbo" Robertson – guitars, backing vocals	Another Perfect Day (1983)
January – February 1984	Lemmy Kilmister – bass, lead vocals; Phil "Philthy Animal" Taylor – drums; Michael "Würzel" Burston – guitar, backing vocals; Phil "Wizzö" Campbell – guitar, backing vocals	"Ace of Spades" (The Young Ones) (1984)
Spring 1984 – March 1987	Lemmy Kilmister – bass, lead vocals; Michael "Würzel" Burston – guitar, backing vocals; Phil "Wizzö" Campbell – guitar, backing vocals; Pete Gill – drums	No Remorse (1984) – four new tracks; The Birthday Party (1986); Orgasmatron (1986); BBC Live & In-Session (2005) – five tracks
March 1987 – April 1992	Lemmy Kilmister – bass, lead vocals; Michael "Würzel" Burston – guitar, backing vocals; Phil "Wizzö" Campbell – guitar, backing vocals; Phil "Philthy Animal" Taylor – drums	Rock 'n' Roll (1987); "Live in Athens" (1988); 1916 (1991); Everything Louder than Everything Else (1991); March ör Die (1992) – one track only; Live at Brixton '87 (1994)
April – May 1992	Lemmy Kilmister – bass, lead vocals; Michael "Würzel" Burston – guitar, backing vocals; Phil "Wizzö" Campbell – guitar, backing vocals; Tommy Aldridge – drums (session member)	March ör Die (1992) – nine tracks
May 1992 – early 1995	Lemmy Kilmister – bass, lead vocals; Michael "Würzel" Burston – guitar, backing vocals; Phil "Wizzö" Campbell – guitar, backing vocals; Mikkey Dee – drums	March ör Die (1992) – remaining track; Bastards (1993); Sacrifice (1995)
Early 1995 – December 2015	Lemmy Kilmister – bass, lead vocals; Phil "Wizzö" Campbell – guitars, backing vocals; Mikkey Dee – drums	Overnight Sensation (1996); Snake Bite Love (1998); Everything Louder than Everyone Else (1999); We Are Motörhead (2000); Hammered (2002); Live at Brixton Academy (2003); Inferno (2004); Stage Fright (2005); Kiss of Death (2006); Better Motörhead than Dead (2007); Motörizer (2008); The Wörld Is Yours (2010); The World Is Ours, Vol. 1 (2011); The World Is Ours, Vol. 2 (2012); Aftershock (2013); Bad Magic (2015); Clean Your Clock (2016)
