= Robert John (photographer) =

American music photographer (born 1961)

Robert John (born November 10, 1961, in Birmingham, Alabama) is an American music photographer. He was the primary photographer for the hard rock band Guns N' Roses for almost two decades.

== Biography ==
Born in Birmingham, Alabama on November 10, 1961, John moved to California with his parents when he was three years old. In his youth, he had a racing career that ended after an injury to his back and the death of his father.

In 1982, John started as a professional photographer in the music industry by shooting W.A.S.P., London, LA Guns and Hollywood Rose. When the latter became Guns N' Roses, John worked with them and became their exclusive photographer when the band was signed to Geffen Records. Currently he is staff photographer at Twisted South Magazine and Evel Knievel Enterprises.

In 2003, John sued Guns N' Roses frontman Axl Rose for breach of contract over photos that John had been taking of the band since 1985. He later established an online video channel dedicated to the band.

In 2014, John married his wife Lori Moody, born and raised in Downey, California. He has two step sons; Kenny And Christian Perez.

== Clients ==
=== Music ===
- Alice Cooper
- Asia
- Eric Clapton
- Ozzy Osbourne
- Elton John
- Backstreet Boys
- The Rolling Stones
- The Cult
- London
- Aerosmith
- Jane's Addiction
- Faith No More
- Marilyn Manson
- Sepultura
- W.A.S.P.
- London
- LA Guns
- Guns N' Roses (originally photographed them as Hollywood Rose)
  - became the band's exclusive photographer when the band signed to Geffen Records
  - authored one book entitled Guns N' Roses: The Photographic History
  - photography appears in a Guns N' Roses pinball machine
  - appeared in:
    - Appetite For Destruction: The Days of Guns N' Roses by Danny Sugerman
    - Hollywood Rocks! on Cleopatra Records.
    - cameo appearances in some Guns N' Roses music videos
  - featured on TV in:
    - VH1's Behind The Music
    - a BBC documentary called Guns N' Roses: The Photographic History (named after John's book) by Indigo Productions
    - Bio. Guns N' Roses - Biography.
- Motörhead
  - albums
    - Inferno
    - Kiss of Death
    - Motörizer
    - The Wörld Is Yours
    - Aftershock
  - photographed the tours that supported those releases

==== Record labels ====
- Geffen Records
- Sony BMG, Universal Records
- Warner Bros. Records
- Interscope
- Atlantic Records
- Virgin Records
- Island Records
- Capitol Records
- Columbia Records
- RCA Records
- Elektra Records
- EMI
- SPV GmbH
- Century Media
- Metal Blade

=== Magazines ===
- Rolling Stone
- Kerrang!
- Spin
- Alternative Press
- Revolver
- Guitar World
- Guitarist
- Deep Purple in Rock
- Terrorizer
- Metal Edge
- Metal Hammer
