= Clean Your Clock =

Live album by Motörhead
- Released: 10 June 2016
- Recorded: 20–21 November 2015
- Venue: Zenith, Munich, Germany
- Genre: Heavy metal; hard rock
- Length: 165 minutes (DVD/Blu-ray)
- Label: UDR GmbH
- Producer: Motörhead

Motörhead chronology
Bad Magic (2015)	Clean Your Clock (2016)	Under Cöver (2017)

Motörhead live album chronology
The Wörld Is Ours – Vol. 2: Anyplace Crazy as Anywhere Else (2012)	Clean Your Clock (2016)	Louder Than Noise... Live in Berlin (2021)

Clean Your Clock is the thirteenth live album by the band Motörhead, released on 10 June 2016, approximately six months after the death of vocalist and bassist Lemmy. Lemmy dedicated the song "Doctor Rock" to Phil Taylor, Motörhead's drummer from 1976–1983 and from 1987–1992, who died a week before the live album was recorded.

== Recording ==
The album was recorded during their European 40th Anniversary tour. It is compiled from two sold-out shows at the Zenith in Munich, Germany, on 20 and 21 November 2015 (both nights were filmed but only the first show was released). Unbeknownst to UDR Records at the time, these two shows would turn out to be the last Motörhead live shows that were recorded professionally.

== Release ==
=== Formats ===
The show was released as a live album and as a concert film in a variety of formats:

- 2 LP coloured vinyl (gate-fold sleeve w/pop-up artwork) and download card
- Single CD
- DVD and CD
- Blu-Ray and CD
- Box set: 2 LP coloured vinyl (gate-fold sleeve w/pop-up artwork), download card, DVD, CD (mini gate-fold sleeve w/pop-up artwork, Blu-ray and a metal pin
- Box set (UDR exclusive): 2 LP coloured vinyl (gate-fold sleeve w/pop-up artwork), download card, DVD, CD (mini gate-fold sleeve w/pop-up artwork), Blu-ray and a silver or gold pin
- Digital download

=== YouTube ===
Four songs from the Blu-ray were released on UDR's YouTube channel. These are:

- "Bomber"
- "When the Sky Comes Looking for You"
- "Overkill"
- "The Chase Is Better Than the Catch"

== Track listing ==
No.	Title	Original Release	Length
1.	"Bomber"	1979 ~ Bomber	3:35
2.	"Stay Clean"	1979 ~ Overkill	3:20
3.	"Metropolis"	1979 ~ Overkill	4:10
4.	"When the Sky Comes Looking for You"	2015 ~ Bad Magic	3:46
5.	"Over the Top"	1979 ~ Bomber (Single)	2:53
6.	"Guitar Solo"		1:59
7.	"The Chase Is Better Than the Catch"	1980 ~ Ace of Spades	5:09
8.	"Lost Woman Blues"	2013 ~ Aftershock	4:43
9.	"Rock It"	1983 ~ Another Perfect Day	3:09
10.	"Orgasmatron"	1986 ~ Orgasmatron	5:39
11.	"Doctor Rock"	1986 ~ Orgasmatron	8:57
12.	"Just 'Cos You Got the Power"	1987 ~ Eat the Rich	5:57
13.	"No Class"	1979 ~ Overkill	3:13
14.	"Ace of Spades"	1980 ~ Ace of Spades	3:50
15.	"Whorehouse Blues"	2004 ~ Inferno	4:36
16.	"Overkill"	1979 ~ Overkill	8:59
Total length:			1:14:01

== Personnel ==
- Lemmy Kilmister – bass, lead vocals
- Phil Campbell – guitars, backing vocals
- Mikkey Dee – drums

== Charts ==
Chart (2016)	Peak position
Australian Albums (ARIA)	67
Austrian Albums (Ö3 Austria)	6
Belgian Albums (Ultratop Flanders)	20
Belgian Albums (Ultratop Wallonia)	29
Dutch Albums (Album Top 100)	75
Finnish Albums (Suomen virallinen lista)	9
French Albums (SNEP)	77
German Albums (Offizielle Top 100)	2
Hungarian Albums (MAHASZ)	20
Italian Albums (FIMI)	55
New Zealand Heatseekers Albums (RMNZ)	2
Norwegian Albums (VG-lista)	18
Scottish Albums (OCC)	22
Spanish Albums (PROMUSICAE)	27
Swiss Albums (Schweizer Hitparade)	15
UK Albums (OCC)	36
UK Independent Albums (OCC)	6
UK Rock & Metal Albums (OCC)	3
US Top Hard Rock Albums (Billboard)	21
US Independent Albums (Billboard)	46
