= Stage Fright (video) =

Video by Motörhead
- Released: 18 July 2005
- Recorded: 7 December 2004
- Genre: Heavy metal
- Length: 240 min
- Label: Steamhammer/SPV
- Producer: Motörhead

Professional ratings
Review scores
Source	Rating
AllMusic	4.5/5 stars

Stage Fright is a 2005 double DVD (or single DVD + bonus CD) by the British rock and roll band Motörhead. It was filmed on 7 December 2004 in Düsseldorf, Germany, to commemorate the band's 30th anniversary.

== Track listing ==
=== DVD 1: The Concert ===
No.	Title	Writer(s)	Original album	Length
1.	"Doctor Rock"	Ian "Lemmy" Kilmister, Phil Campbell, Michael "Würzel" Burston, Pete Gill	1986 ~ Orgasmatron
2.	"Stay Clean"	Kilmister, "Fast" Eddie Clarke, Phil "Philthy Animal" Taylor	1979 ~ Overkill
3.	"Shoot You in the Back"	Kilmister, Clarke, Taylor	1980 ~ Ace of Spades
4.	"Love Me Like a Reptile"	Kilmister, Clarke, Taylor	1980 ~ Ace of Spades
5.	"Killers"	Kilmister, Campbell, Mikkey Dee	2004 ~ Inferno
6.	"Metropolis"	Kilmister, Clarke, Taylor	1979 ~ Overkill
7.	"Over the Top"	Kilmister, Clarke, Taylor	1979 ~ Bomber (Single)
8.	"No Class"	Kilmister, Clarke, Taylor	1979 ~ Overkill
9.	"I Got Mine"	Kilmister, Brian "Robbo" Robertson, Taylor	1983 ~ Another Perfect Day
10.	"In the Name of Tragedy"	Kilmister, Campbell, Dee	2004 ~ Inferno
11.	"Dancing on Your Grave"	Kilmister, Robertson, Taylor	1983 ~ Another Perfect Day
12.	"R.A.M.O.N.E.S."	Kilmister, Campbell, Burston, Taylor	1991 ~ 1916
13.	"Sacrifice"	Kilmister, Campbell, Dee	1995 ~ Sacrifice
14.	"Just 'Cos You Got the Power"	Kilmister, Campbell, Burston, Taylor	1987 ~ Eat the Rich
15.	"Going to Brazil"	Kilmister, Campbell, Burston, Taylor	1991 ~ 1916
16.	"Killed by Death"	Kilmister, Campbell, Burston, Gill	1984 ~ No Remorse
17.	"Iron Fist"	Kilmister, Clarke, Taylor	1982 ~ Iron Fist
18.	"Whorehouse Blues"	Kilmister, Campbell, Dee	2004 ~ Inferno
19.	"Ace of Spades"	Kilmister, Clarke, Taylor	1980 ~ Ace of Spades
20.	"Overkill"	Kilmister, Clarke, Taylor	1979 ~ Overkill

=== DVD 2: Features ===
Bonus DVD: L.A. Special

1. Fans
2. Making Of 'live show'
3. Testimonials
4. We Are The Road Crew
5. Slide Show
6. The Backstage Rider

We are the road crew

1. Introduction
2. Crew
3. Sound
4. Showtime
5. The cook
6. Touring

DVD ROM

1. "Overkill" High Definition Track (DVD ROM)
2. "Life’s a Bitch" - Realtone (DVD ROM)
3. Motörhead Wallpapers (DVD ROM)
4. L.A. Slideshow (DVD ROM)
5. Discography (DVD ROM)

=== CD ===
No.	Title	Writer(s)	Original album	Length
1.	"Doctor Rock"	Kilmister, Campbell, Burston, Gill	1986 ~ Orgasmatron
2.	"Stay Clean"	Kilmister, Clarke, Taylor	1979 ~ Overkill
3.	"Shoot You in the Back"	Kilmister, Clarke, Taylor	1980 ~ Ace of Spades
4.	"Love Me Like a Reptile"	Kilmister, Clarke, Taylor	1980 ~ Ace of Spades
5.	"Killers"	Kilmister, Campbell, Dee	2004 ~ Inferno
6.	"Metropolis"	Kilmister, Clarke, Taylor	1979 ~ Overkill
7.	"In the Name of Tragedy"	Kilmister, Campbell, Dee	2004 ~ Inferno
8.	"Dancing on Your Grave"	Kilmister, Robertson, Taylor	1983 ~ Another Perfect Day
9.	"R.A.M.O.N.E.S."	Kilmister, Campbell, Burston, Taylor	1991 ~ 1916
10.	"Sacrifice"	Kilmister, Campbell, Dee	1995 ~ Sacrifice
11.	"Just 'Cos You Got the Power"	Kilmister, Campbell, Burston, Taylor	1987 ~ Eat The Rich
12.	"Going to Brazil"	Kilmister, Campbell, Burston, Taylor	1991 ~ 1916
13.	"Killed by Death"	Kilmister, Campbell, Burston, Gill	1984 ~ No Remorse
14.	"Iron Fist"	Kilmister, Clarke, Taylor	1982 ~ Iron Fist
15.	"Whorehouse Blues"	Kilmister, Campbell, Dee	2004 ~ Inferno
16.	"Ace of Spades"	Kilmister, Clarke, Taylor	1980 ~ Ace of Spades
17.	"Overkill"	Kilmister, Clarke, Taylor	1979 ~ Overkill

== Credits ==
- Lemmy - vocals, bass, harmonica on Whorehouse Blues
- Phil Campbell - guitar, backing vocals, acoustic guitar on Whorehouse Blues
- Mikkey Dee - drums, acoustic guitar on Whorehouse Blues

== Certifications ==
Region	Certification	Certified units/sales
Germany (BVMI)	Gold	25,000^{^}
^{^} Shipments figures based on certification alone.
