= The Wörld Is Ours – Vol. 2: Anyplace Crazy as Anywhere Else =

Live album by Motörhead
- Released: 21 September 2012
- Recorded: 10 July 2011; 6 August 2011; 25 September 2011
- Venue: Sonisphere Knebworth, England; Wacken Open Air, Schleswig-Holstein, Germany; Rock in Rio, Brazil
- Length: 2:14:56
- Label: UDR GmbH / EMI
- Producer: Motörhead

Motörhead chronology
The Wörld Is Ours - Vol. 1: Everywhere Further Than Everyplace Else (2011)	The Wörld Is Ours – Vol. 2: Anyplace Crazy as Anywhere Else (2012)	Aftershock (2013)

Professional ratings
Review scores
Source	Rating
Blabbermouth	9/10 stars
Metal Hammer	3.5/5 stars
Laut.de	3/5 stars

The Wörld Is Ours – Vol. 2: Anyplace Crazy as Anywhere Else is the twelfth live album by the band Motörhead, released on 21 September 2012, the third UDR GmbH / Motörhead Music / EMI collaboration, and is the entire concert in August 2011 at the Wacken Open Air, Germany, with parts of the concerts in July 2011 at the Sonisphere Knebworth Festival, England and in September 2011 at Rock in Rio, Brazil.

== Recording ==
This was recorded on the 2011 leg of The Wörld is Ours tour. It is the entire concert at the Wacken Open Air Festival in Itzehoe, Schleswig-Holstein, Germany on 6 August, has parts of the Sonisphere Knebworth Festival, Knebworth, England on 10 July, and parts of the Rock in Rio, Rio de Janeiro, Brazil on 25 September 2011. Unlike the previous two live albums, there are no guest musicians appearing on the album. This completes The Wörld Is Ours tour recordings, which started in 2010 and made it around the world, including Australia.

== Release ==
This is released in a single DVD and a 2 CD, both in 5.1 Surround and 2.0 Stereo formats, and had a special DVD and CD release, just like its predecessor. Like the vast majority of albums by Motörhead since the mid 2000s, the release didn't impact on the public at large but did well with its regular fan bases around the world.

If anything, it highlights the band's set by this stage in their career, as having progressed for so many years and nineteen albums later, it is at the point where time restraints are the problem. By now the band was playing a mixture of eighties songs – "Iron Fist" opening this half of the tour, "Over the Top" played for the first time in over twenty years, "The Chase Is Better Than The Catch" not seen until a revival in the recent years, "Just 'Cos You Got The Power" as well a long time missing from the live set, and "Killed by Death" which has barely missed a concert since being written in 1984; The track "Going to Brazil" continuing to be the sole song written in the nineties played live for some time; The very long-time staples of "Stay Clean", "Metropolis", "Ace of Spades" and "Overkill", having been played at every single concert, with very few exceptions, since being written. There is also a good mixture of newer songs, from their albums released after 2000, representing the now 15 years running lineup of Lemmy, Philip and Mikkey, the longest lineup the band has had, by more than double, when in its 35th year at the time of these recordings.

== Track listing ==
=== Disc one ===
Live at the Wacken Open Air Festival, Germany on 6 August 2011 (part one)
No.	Title	Writer(s)	Original album	Length
1.	"Iron Fist"	Kilmister, Clarke, Taylor	1982 ~ Iron Fist	4:20
2.	"Stay Clean"	Kilmister, Clarke, Taylor	1979 ~ Overkill	3:31
3.	"Get Back in Line"		2010 ~ The Wörld Is Yours	4:30
4.	"Metropolis"	Kilmister, Clarke, Taylor	1979 ~ Overkill	5:10
5.	"Over the Top"	Kilmister, Clarke, Taylor	1979 ~ Bomber (Single)	2:44
6.	"One Night Stand"		2006 ~ Kiss of Death	3:47
7.	"Rock Out"		2008 ~ Motörizer	2:25
8.	"The Thousand Names of God"		2008 ~ Motörizer	7:00
9.	"I Know How to Die"		2010 ~ The Wörld Is Yours	3:13
10.	"The Chase Is Better Than the Catch"	Kilmister, Clarke, Taylor	1980 ~ Ace of Spades	5:39
11.	"In the Name of Tragedy"		2004 ~ Inferno	8:02
12.	"Just 'Cos You Got the Power"	Kilmister, Campbell, Burston, Taylor	1987 ~ Eat the Rich	6:27
13.	"Going to Brazil"	Kilmister, Campbell, Burston, Taylor	1991 ~ 1916	3:04
14.	"Killed by Death"	Kilmister, Burston, Campbell, Gill	1984 ~ No Remorse	5:14
15.	"Bomber"	Kilmister, Clarke, Taylor	1979 ~ Bomber	4:04

=== Disc two ===
Live at the Wacken Open Air Festival, Germany on 6 August 2011 (part two)
No.	Title	Writer(s)	Original album	Length
1.	"Ace of Spades"	Kilmister, Clarke, Taylor	1980 ~ Ace of Spades	4:55
2.	"Overkill"	Kilmister, Clarke, Taylor	1979 ~ Overkill	8:03

Live at the Sonisphere Knebworth Festival, England on 10 July 2011
No.	Title	Writer(s)	Original album	Length
3.	"Iron Fist"	Kilmister, Clarke, Taylor	1982 ~ Iron Fist	4:29
4.	"I Know How to Die"		2010 ~ The Wörld is Yours	3:07
5.	"In the Name of Tragedy"		2004 ~ Inferno	6:53
6.	"Killed by Death"	Kilmister, Burston, Campbell, Gill	1984 ~ No Remorse	5:12
7.	"Ace of Spades"	Kilmister, Clarke, Taylor	1980 ~ Ace of Spades	5:16
8.	"Overkill"	Kilmister, Clarke, Taylor	1979 ~ Overkill	7:46

Live at Rock in Rio, Brazil on 25 September 2011
No.	Title	Writer(s)	Original album	Length
9.	"Stay Clean"	Kilmister, Clarke, Taylor	1979 ~ Overkill	3:06
10.	"Over the Top"	Kilmister, Clarke, Taylor	1979 ~ Bomber (Single)	3:45
11.	"The Chase Is Better Than the Catch"	Kilmister, Clarke, Taylor	1980 ~ Ace of Spades	5:31
12.	"Going to Brazil"	Kilmister, Campbell, Burston, Taylor	1991 ~ 1916	2:38
13.	"Killed by Death"	Kilmister, Burston, Campbell, Gill	1984 ~ No Remorse	5:05

=== DVD ===
All tracks are written by Kilmister, Campbell, Dee.

Live at the Wacken Open Air Festival, Germany on 6 August 2011
No.	Title	Writer(s)	Original album	Length
1.	"Iron Fist"	Kilmister, Clarke, Taylor	1982 ~ Iron Fist	4:20
2.	"Stay Clean"	Kilmister, Clarke, Taylor	1979 ~ Overkill	3:31
3.	"Get Back in Line"		2010 ~ The Wörld Is Yours	4:30
4.	"Metropolis"	Kilmister, Clarke, Taylor	1979 ~ Overkill	5:10
5.	"Over the Top"	Kilmister, Clarke, Taylor	1979 ~ Bomber (Single)	2:44
6.	"One Night Stand"		2006 ~ Kiss of Death	3:47
7.	"Rock Out"		2008 ~ Motörizer	2:25
8.	"The Thousand Names of God"		2008 ~ Motörizer	7:00
9.	"I Know How to Die"		2010 ~ The Wörld Is Yours	3:13
10.	"The Chase Is Better Than the Catch"	Kilmister, Clarke, Taylor	1980 ~ Ace of Spades	5:39
11.	"In the Name of Tragedy"		2004 ~ Inferno	8:02
12.	"Just 'Cos You Got the Power"	Kilmister, Campbell, Burston, Taylor	1987 ~ Eat the Rich	6:27
13.	"Going to Brazil"	Kilmister, Campbell, Burston, Taylor	1991 ~ 1916	3:04
14.	"Killed by Death"	Kilmister, Burston, Campbell, Gill	1984 ~ No Remorse	5:14
15.	"Bomber"	Kilmister, Clarke, Taylor	1979 ~ Bomber	4:04
16.	"Ace of Spades"	Kilmister, Clarke, Taylor	1980 ~ Ace of Spades	4:55
17.	"Overkill"	Kilmister, Clarke, Taylor	1979 ~ Overkill	8:03

Live at the Sonisphere Knebworth Festival, England on 10 July 2011
No.	Title	Writer(s)	Original album	Length
1.	"Iron Fist"	Kilmister, Clarke, Taylor	1982 ~ Iron Fist	4:29
2.	"I Know How to Die"		2010 ~ The Wörld Is Yours	3:07
3.	"In the Name of Tragedy"		2004 ~ Inferno	6:53
4.	"Killed by Death"	Kilmister, Burston, Campbell, Gill	1984 ~ No Remorse	5:12
5.	"Ace of Spades"	Kilmister, Clarke, Taylor	1980 ~ Ace of Spades	5:16
6.	"Overkill"	Kilmister, Clarke, Taylor	1979 ~ Overkill	7:46

Live at Rock in Rio, Brazil on 25 September 2011
No.	Title	Writer(s)	Original album	Length
1.	"Stay Clean"	Kilmister, Clarke, Taylor	1979 ~ Overkill	3:06
2.	"Over the Top"	Kilmister, Clarke, Taylor	1979 ~ Bomber (Single)	3:45
3.	"The Chase Is Better Than the Catch"	Kilmister, Clarke, Taylor	1980 ~ Ace of Spades	5:31
4.	"Going to Brazil"	Kilmister, Campbell, Burston, Taylor	1991 ~ 1916	2:38
5.	"Killed by Death"	Kilmister, Burston, Campbell, Gill	1984 ~ No Remorse	5:05

== Personnel ==
Per The Wörld Is Ours – Vol. 2: Anyplace Crazy as Anywhere Else liner notes.

- Lemmy Kilmister – lead vocals, bass
- Phil Campbell – lead guitar, backing vocals
- Mikkey Dee – drums
- Motörhead – executive producers

== Charts ==
Chart (2012)	Peak position
German Albums (Offizielle Top 100)	44
UK Rock & Metal Albums (OCC)	13
