= All the Aces =

Compilation album by Motörhead
- Released: 8 November 1993
- Genres: Heavy metal; speed metal
- Length: 106:50
- Label: Castle

Motörhead chronology
Bastards (1993)	All the Aces (1993)	Live at Brixton '87 (1994)

Professional ratings
Review scores
Source	Rating
AllMusic	4/5 stars
The Encyclopedia of Popular Music	2/5 stars
Hi-Fi News & Record Review	D:1
Kerrang!	4/5 stars
Spin Alternative Record Guide	5/10

All the Aces is a compilation album by the band Motörhead, released on 8 November 1993. It includes 14 of their most popular songs, 2 enhanced multimedia sections and 8 previously unreleased live songs by The Muggers (a band formed by "Fast" Eddie Clarke and Phil "Philthy Animal" Taylor of Motörhead with John "Speedy" Keen and Billy Rath).

== Track listing ==
=== Track List ===
Disc 1 - ("All the Aces")
No.	Title	Original Release	Length
1.	"Ace of Spades"	1980 ~ Ace of Spades	2:48
2.	"Killed by Death"	1984 ~ No Remorse	4:34
3.	"Motörhead" (Live in 1981)	1981 ~ No Sleep 'til Hammersmith	4:43
4.	"Iron Fist"	1982 ~ Iron Fist	2:52
5.	"Orgasmatron"	1986 ~ Orgasmatron	5:22
6.	"Love Me Like a Reptile"	1980 ~ Ace of Spades	3:21
7.	"(We Are) The Road Crew"	1980 ~ Ace of Spades	3:09
8.	"Bomber"	1979 ~ Bomber	3:40
9.	"The Chase Is Better Than the Catch"	1980 ~ Ace of Spades	4:16
10.	"Louie, Louie"	1978 ~ single	2:46
11.	"No Class"	1979 ~ Overkill	2:39
12.	"Deaf Forever"	1986 ~ Orgasmatron	4:27
13.	"Over the Top"	1979 ~ "Bomber" single B-side	3:15
14.	"Overkill"	1979 ~ Overkill	5.11
15.	"Ace of Spades" (CCN Remix)		5:17
Total length:			58:20

Bonus tracks
No.	Title	Length
16.	"Ace of Spades" (Live) - (Enhanced Multimedia Sections)
17.	"Motörhead" (Live) - (Enhanced Multimedia Sections)

=== CD 2 - "The Muggers Tapes" ===
1. "White Lightning" – 5:34
2. "Space Chaser" – 4:43
3. "Somethin' Else" (Eddie Cochran cover) – 5:48
4. "Would If I Could" – 5:07
5. "(Just A) Nightmare" – 6:54
6. "Cinnamon Girl" (Neil Young cover) – 5:17
7. "Summertime Blues" (Eddie Cochran cover) – 5:24
8. "Killer, Killer" – 5:43
