= The Wörld Is Ours – Vol. 1: Everywhere Further Than Everyplace Else =

Live album by Motörhead
- Released: 22 November 2011
- Recorded: 16 November 2010; 28 February 2011; 9 April 2011
- Venue: Manchester Apollo, England; Best Buy Theatre, NYC; Teatro Caupolicán, Santiago
- Length: 2:59:35
- Label: UDR GmbH / EMI
- Producer: Motörhead

Motörhead chronology
The Wörld Is Yours (2010)	The Wörld Is Ours – Vol. 1: Everywhere Further Than Everyplace Else (2011)	The Wörld Is Ours - Vol. 2: Anyplace Crazy as Anywhere Else (2012)

Professional ratings
Review scores
Source	Rating
AllMusic	3.0/5 stars
Blabbermouth	8/10 stars

The Wörld Is Ours – Vol. 1: Everywhere Further Than Everyplace Else is the eleventh live album by the band Motörhead, released on 22 November 2011, the second release with the UDR / Motörhead Music / EMI collaboration of distribution in various territories, and is the entire concert in April 2011 at the Teatro Caupolicán, Santiago, Chile with parts of the concerts in February 2011 at the Best Buy Theatre, New York City and in November 2010 at the Manchester Apollo, England.

== Recording ==
Filmed and recorded on tour over 2010 and 2011, it is the entire concert of the Teatro Caupolicán, Santiago appearance on 9 April 2011, with parts of the Manchester Apollo concert on 16 November 2010, on the UK leg of the tour, and the special appearance at Best Buy Theatre in New York City on 28 February 2011. It has guest appearances from Doro Pesch, Todd Youth and Michael Monroe. Doro and Todd Youth have been regular guests of Motörhead for some years, joining them live regularly when on tour in Europe especially, having appeared on their last three live albums also. It is the first time the Finnish rocker Michael Monroe has made an appearance with Motörhead live.

== Release ==
The live album is released as both a DVD and a CD; issued as a single Blu-ray DVD or 2 CDs, and also released in a special 2 CD & 1 DVD package, all versions have both 5.1 Surround and 2.0 Stereo available. Recorded on The Wörld is Yours world tour of 2010 and 2011, it made the usual amount of noise the band had at this point in their career, and is part of a two volume release of the tour.

It features a large repertoire of the band's work over the years. The modern regular set opener "We Are Motörhead", which replaced Motörhead the song; "Over the Top", "The Chase Is Better Than The Catch" and "I Got Mine" from the early eighties; "Just 'Cos You Got The Power" and "Killed by Death" from the late eighties; "Going to Brazil" the only track from the nineties; and various tracks from the albums released since 2000, with the usual set regulars of "Stay Clean", "Metropolis", "Ace of Spades" and "Overkill". The recordings at this stage had improved in sound quality far exceeding previous material, this being the first Surround Sound mix Motörhead have released.

== Track listing ==
=== DVD ===
All tracks are written by Kilmister, Campbell, Dee except where noted.

Live in Teatro Caupolicán, Santiago, Chile 9 April 2011
No.	Title	Writer(s)	Original album	Length
1.	"Iron Fist"	Kilmister, Clarke, Taylor	1982 ~ Iron Fist	4:56
2.	"Stay Clean"	Kilmister, "Fast" Eddie Clarke, Phil "Philthy Animal" Taylor	1979 ~ Overkill	3:26
3.	"Get Back in Line"		2010 ~ The Wörld Is Yours	4:12
4.	"Metropolis"	Kilmister, Clarke, Taylor	1979 ~ Overkill	4:36
5.	"Over the Top"	Kilmister, Clarke, Taylor	1979 ~ Bomber (Single)	2:35
6.	"One Night Stand"		2006 ~ Kiss of Death	3:47
7.	"Rock Out"		2008 ~ Motörizer	2:13
8.	"The Thousand Names of God"		2008 ~ Motörizer	6:58
9.	"I Got Mine"	Kilmister, Brian Robertson, Taylor	1983 ~ Another Perfect Day	5:05
10.	"I Know How to Die"		2010 ~ The Wörld is Yours	3:06
11.	"The Chase Is Better Than the Catch"	Kilmister, Clarke, Taylor	1980 ~ Ace of Spades	5:20
12.	"In the Name of Tragedy"		2004 ~ Inferno	7:44
13.	"Just 'Cos You Got the Power"	Kilmister, Campbell, Michael "Würzel" Burston, Taylor	1987 ~ Eat the Rich	5:53
14.	"Going to Brazil"	Kilmister, Campbell, Burston, Taylor	1991 ~ 1916	2:52
15.	"Killed by Death"	Kilmister, Burston, Campbell, Pete Gill	1984 ~ No Remorse	5:13
16.	"Ace of Spades"	Kilmister, Clarke, Taylor	1980 ~ Ace of Spades	5:22
17.	"Overkill"	Kilmister, Clarke, Taylor	1979 ~ Overkill	6:50

Live at Best Buy Theatre in New York City on 28 February 2011
No.	Title	Writer(s)	Original album	Length
1.	"Rock Out"		2008 ~ Motörizer	2:24
2.	"The Thousand Names of God"		2008 ~ Motörizer	6:29
3.	"Killed by Death" (feat. Doro and Todd Youth)	Kilmister, Burston, Campbell, Gill	1984 ~ No Remorse	4:57

Live at the Manchester Apollo, England on 16 November 2010
No.	Title	Writer(s)	Original album	Length
1.	"We Are Motörhead"		2000 ~ We Are Motörhead	2:44
2.	"Stay Clean"	Kilmister, Clarke, Taylor	1979 ~ Overkill	3:06
3.	"Be My Baby"		2006 ~ Kiss of Death	4:10
4.	"Get Back in Line"		2010 ~ The Wörld is Yours	4:04
5.	"I Know How to Die"		2010 ~ The Wörld is Yours	3:25
6.	"Born to Raise Hell" (feat. Michael Monroe)	Kilmister	1993 ~ Bastards	5:30

=== CD 1 ===
Live in Teatro Caupolicán, Santiago, Chile 9 April 2011 (part one)
No.	Title	Writer(s)	Original album	Length
1.	"Iron Fist"	Kilmister, Clarke, Taylor	1982 ~ Iron Fist	4:56
2.	"Stay Clean"	Kilmister, Clarke, Taylor	1979 ~ Overkill	3:26
3.	"Get Back in Line"		2010 ~ The Wörld is Yours	4:12
4.	"Metropolis"	Kilmister, Clarke, Taylor	1979 ~ Overkill	4:36
5.	"Over the Top"	Kilmister, Clarke, Taylor	1979 ~ Bomber (Single)	2:35
6.	"One Night Stand"		2006 ~ Kiss of Death	3:47
7.	"Rock Out"		2008 ~ Motörizer	2:13
8.	"The Thousand Names of God"		2008 ~ Motörizer	6:58
9.	"I Got Mine"	Kilmister, Robertson, Taylor	1983 ~ Another Perfect Day	5:05
10.	"I Know How to Die"		2010 ~ The Wörld is Yours	3:06
11.	"The Chase Is Better Than the Catch"	Kilmister, Clarke, Taylor	1980 ~ Ace of Spades	5:20
12.	"In the Name of Tragedy"		2004 ~ Inferno	7:44
13.	"Just 'Cos You Got the Power"	Kilmister, Campbell, Burston, Taylor	1987 ~ Eat the Rich	5:53

=== CD 2 ===
Live in Teatro Caupolicán, Santiago, Chile 9 April 2011 (part two)
No.	Title	Writer(s)	Original album	Length
1.	"Going to Brazil"	Kilmister, Campbell, Burston, Taylor	1991 ~ 1916	2:52
2.	"Killed by Death"	Kilmister, Burston, Campbell, Gill	1984 ~ No Remorse	5:13
3.	"Ace of Spades"	Kilmister, Clarke, Taylor	1980 ~ Ace of Spades	5:22
4.	"Overkill"	Kilmister, Clarke, Taylor	1979 ~ Overkill	6:50

Live at Best Buy Theatre in New York City on 28 February 2011
No.	Title	Writer(s)	Original album	Length
5.	"Rock Out"		2008 ~ Motörizer	2:24
6.	"The Thousand Names of God"		2008 ~ Motörizer	6:29
7.	"Killed by Death"	Kilmister, Burston, Campbell, Gill	1984 ~ No Remorse	4:57

Live at the Manchester Apollo, England on 16 November 2010
No.	Title	Writer(s)	Original album	Length
8.	"We Are Motörhead"		2000 ~ We Are Motörhead	2:44
9.	"Stay Clean"	Kilmister, Clarke, Taylor	1979 ~ Overkill	3:06
10.	"Be My Baby"		2006 ~ Kiss of Death	4:10
11.	"Get Back in Line"		2010 ~ The Wörld is Yours	4:04
12.	"I Know How to Die"		2010 ~ The Wörld is Yours	3:25
13.	"Born to Raise Hell"	Kilmister	1993 ~ Bastards	5:30

== Personnel ==
Per The Wörld Is Ours – Vol. 1: Everywhere Further Than Everyplace Else liner notes.

- Lemmy Kilmister – lead vocals, bass
- Phil Campbell – lead guitar, backing vocals
- Mikkey Dee – drums
- Doro – co-vocals on "Killed by Death" in NYC
- Todd Youth – co-lead guitar on "Killed by Death" in NYC
- Michael Monroe – co-vocals on "Born to Raise Hell" in Manchester
- Motörhead – executive producers

== Charts ==
Chart (2011)	Peak position
Finnish Albums (Suomen virallinen lista)	32
German Albums (Offizielle Top 100)	52
UK Rock & Metal Albums (OCC)	11
