= Live at Brixton '87 =

Live album by Motörhead
- Released: 28 March 1994
- Recorded: 23 December 1987
- Venue: Brixton Academy, London, UK
- Genre: Heavy metal
- Length: 48:39
- Label: Roadrunner

Motörhead chronology
All the Aces (1993)	Live at Brixton '87 (1994)	Sacrifice (1995)

Live at Brixton '87 is the fifth live album by the band Motörhead, recorded on 23 December 1987, at the Brixton Academy in London, but wasn't released until March 1994. It was released by Roadrunner Records under licence, but without the permission of the band, and as such has a controversial entry into the band's catalogue. Lemmy didn't collaborate with the album until 2005 on its Sanctuary Records reissue.

== Recording ==
The band originally meant to use this concert for what became 1988's Nö Sleep at All live album, but because this material 'went missing' for some years, they couldn't, and the Finnish concert of some 6 months later at the Giants of Rock Festival was used instead. This concert was available as a bootleg for many years, before finally seeing a licensed release under the Dutch label Roadrunner Records in 1994, but the sound quality is still very poor for a 'produced' live album. It was not mastered very well from the original tapes, and the reissued Sanctuary Records release of 2005 does not appear to have had a remaster either. The concert itself is more of a testament to 1986s Orgasmatron and 1987s Rock 'N' Roll album, as most of these songs never got played again live after this tour ended in 1988, until 2004 for one or two.

== Release ==
Originally released in 1994 as Live at Brixton but renamed Live at Brixton '87in 2005 when reissued by Sanctuary Records. Some of the tracks are staples but the majority are tracks not played by the band since this tour.

"Doctor Rock", from the previous studio album Orgasmatron, and "Just 'Cos You Got the Power" from the "Eat the Rich" single, wouldn't be heard from again until the 2004 DVD, Stage Fright.

"Stay Clean", "Metropolis" and "Ace of Spades" have only been missing on two official live albums, Live in Toronto in 1982 with Eddie Clarke and the widely bootlegged Live in Manchester in 1983 with Brian Robertson on guitar, released officially in 2005 as a bonus disk on Another Perfect Day remaster, so their inclusion is not surprising.

"Deaf Forever" and "Built for Speed" from Orgasmatron; "Eat the Rich", "Stone Deaf in the U.S.A.", "Traitor" and "Dogs" from Rock 'N' Roll; all only saw live performances during the 1986-88 tour/s as by the nineties had been dropped completely from the live set, even for random gigs. This is the only official live recording of the song "Rock 'N' Roll" to be released by the band.

Notably missing from this set are "No Class", "Orgasmatron", "Motörhead", "Killed by Death" and "Overkill", all of which were played at the concert but missing from this release and its predecessor, though there is a Japanese bootleg with the complete concert in circulation. Lemmy eventually collaborated with Sanctuary to 'officially' release the album.

== Reception ==
Professional ratings
Review scores
Source	Rating
AllMusic	3/5 stars
The Encyclopedia of Popular Music	2/5 stars
Spin Alternative Record Guide	4/10

AllMusics Eduardo Rivadavia has stated:

"..Bad record deals have plagued Motorhead's career, resulting in countless low-quality live recordings and pointless re-packagings, but 1994's Live at Brixton is one of the rare exceptions...So if you haven't bought No Sleep at All yet, don't! Get this one instead.."

== Track listing ==
All tracks are written by Kilmister, Campbell, Burston, Taylor except where noted.

No.	Title	Writer(s)	Original album	Length
1.	"Doctor Rock"	Kilmister, Burston, Campbell, Gill	1986 ~ Orgasmatron	3:11
2.	"Stay Clean"	Kilmister, Clarke, Taylor	1979 ~ Overkill	2:38
3.	"Traitor"		1987 ~ Rock 'N' Roll	2:49
4.	"Metropolis"	Kilmister, Clarke, Taylor	1979 ~ Overkill	3:14
5.	"Dogs"		1987 ~ Rock 'N' Roll	3:38
6.	"Ace of Spades"	Kilmister, Clarke, Taylor	1980 ~ Ace of Spades	3:08
7.	"Stone Deaf in the U.S.A."		1987 ~ Rock 'N' Roll	3:30
8.	"Eat the Rich"		1987 ~ Rock 'N' Roll	4:50
9.	"Built for Speed"	Kilmister, Burston, Campbell, Gill	1986 ~ Orgasmatron	4:44
10.	"Rock 'N' Roll"		1987 ~ Rock 'N' Roll	3:56
11.	"Deaf Forever"	Kilmister, Burston, Campbell, Gill	1986 ~ Orgasmatron	4:37
12.	"Just 'Cos You Got the Power"		1987 ~ "Eat the Rich" single	8:24

== Personnel ==
- Lemmy Kilmister – lead vocals, bass
- Phil Campbell – lead guitar, backing vocals
- Würzel - lead guitar, backing vocals
- Phil Taylor – drums

Production

- Producer - Mo The Man
- Recorded - Live at the Brixton Academy, Brixton, London 23 December 1987
- Album Design - Hiro Takahashi (cover), Hugh Gilmour (design), Dave Ling (liner notes), Mick Stvenson (photography)
