= Nö Sleep at All =

Live album by Motörhead
- Released: 3 October 1988
- Recorded: 2 July 1988
- Venue: Giants of Rock Festival, Hämeenlinna, Finland
- Genre: Heavy metal
- Length: 51:37
- Label: GWR
- Producer: Motörhead; Guy Bidmead

Motörhead chronology
Rock 'n' Roll (1987)	Nö Sleep at All (1988)	1916 (1991)

The bonus Greek single
- Acropolis (Metropolis) special Greek only release by EMI as a bonus for the first 1000 copies

Singles from Nö Sleep at All
- 1. "Ace of Spades (live)" Released: 1988

Professional ratings
Review scores
Source	Rating
AllMusic	2/5 stars
Robert Christgau	A−
Collector's Guide to Heavy Metal	5/10
The Encyclopedia of Popular Music	3/5 stars
Kerrang!	5/5 stars
Spin Alternative Record Guide	3/10
Uncut	2/5 stars

Nö Sleep at All is the third live album by the English rock band Motörhead. Released in October 1988 by GWR Records, it was their only live album and last release with the label as legal matters continued between the parties.

== Background ==
Motörhead and their record label GWR disagreed over the choice of a single from the album; the band wanted to release "Traitor," which had appeared on their most recent LP Rock 'N' Roll, while the label argued for the Motörhead classic "Ace of Spades". This led to a lawsuit and a parting of the ways. In the book Overkill: The Untold Story of Motörhead, author Joel McIver sums up the band's perilous situation:

"..For much of 1988 and 1989, the road continued to be Motörhead's home, simply because they had no other option. Although headbangers continued to flock to their shows and the band played with as much venom as ever, it was clear in retrospect that the record industry and Motörhead were never likely to see eye to eye. The last few years had been plagued with logistical difficulties, with the last remaining refuge the tour bus.."

Guitarist Würzel is quoted in the insert of the re-mastered CD release, saying;

"..A lot of fans were saying that they want to hear this line-up on a live album. EVERYBODY seems to record at the Hammersmith Odeon don't they? Or the Fillmore East when that was going, or the Budokan and all those flash places. So we thought we'd do it in Finland.."

To promote the album, the band engaged in a tour of North America, opening for Slayer. Lemmy admits that the album was a mistake and failed sales-wise, but considers it to be "all right" and believes it was the mix that let them down, explaining:

"..We had Guy Bidmead mix it because we wanted to give him another try, mainly because he had been Vic Maile's boy and Vic was a great live mixer. After that, I think we finally figured out that Guy just wasn't Vic Maile. Don't get me wrong, though.....after all I've said about Guy, it was only 'cause he was taking orders from us. He was too nice! Vic knew when to tell us to shut the fuck up!.."

== Release ==
EMI Greece pressed a 7" vinyl called "Live in Athens", featuring "Acropolis (Metropolis)" on the A-side and "Orgasmatron" on the B-side; it was shrinkwrapped to the first 1,000 copies of the album. The songs had been taped for the Greek Antenna Metal Show, for which Lemmy retitled "Metropolis" to suit the occasion.

== Track listing ==
All tracks are written by Kilmister, Burston, Campbell, Taylor except where noted.

CD track list
No.	Title	Writer(s)	Original Release	Length
1.	"Doctor Rock"	Kilmister, Burston, Campbell, Pete Gill	1986 ~ Orgasmatron	3:17
2.	"Traitor"		1987 ~ Rock 'N' Roll	2:40
3.	"Dogs"		1987 ~ Rock 'N' Roll	3:24
4.	"Ace of Spades"	Kilmister, Eddie Clarke, Taylor	1980 ~ Ace of Spades	2:51
5.	"Eat the Rich"		1987 ~ Rock 'N' Roll	4:34
6.	"Built for Speed"	Kilmister, Burston, Campbell, Gill	1986 ~ Orgasmatron	4:56
7.	"Deaf Forever"	Kilmister, Burston, Campbell, Gill	1986 ~ Orgasmatron	4:02
8.	"Just 'Cos You Got the Power"		1987 ~ Eat the Rich	7:28
9.	"Killed by Death"	Kilmister, Burston, Campbell, Gill	1984 ~ No Remorse	5:58
10.	"Overkill"	Kilmister, Clarke, Taylor	1979 ~ Overkill	6:33

Castle Communications 1996 reissue bonus tracks
No.	Title	Writer(s)	Original Release	Length
11.	"Stay Clean"	Kilmister, Clarke, Taylor	1979 ~ Overkill	2:37
12.	"Metropolis"	Kilmister, Clarke, Taylor	1979 ~ Overkill	3:18

NOTE: "Metropolis" was recorded on 23 December in 1987 at the Brixton Academy which was later released on Live at Brixton '87

Live at Athens (Greek Single)
No.	Title	Writer(s)	Original Release	Length
1.	"Acropolis" ("Metropolis")	Kilmister, Clarke, Taylor	1979 ~ Overkill
2.	"Orgasmatron"	Kilmister, Campbell, Burston, Gill	1986 ~ Orgasmatron

== Personnel ==
=== Motörhead ===
- Lemmy – lead vocals, bass
- Phil "Wizzö" Campbell – guitar
- Michael "Würzel" Burston – guitars
- Phil "Philthy Animal" Taylor – drums

=== Production ===
- Guy Bidmead - producer
- Richard Dowling - engineer
- Steve Orchard - engineer
- PRT Studios, London - mixing
- Motörhead - executive producers
- John F McGill - design
- Ray Palmer - photography
- Joe Petagno - Snaggletooth

== Charts ==
Chart (1988)	Peak position
Finnish Albums (The Official Finnish Charts)	18
UK Albums (OCC)	79

Chart (2014)	Peak position
French Albums (SNEP)	59
