= The Birthday Party (video) =

Video by Motörhead
- Released: 1985 (VHS)
- Recorded: 26 June 1985
- Venues: Hammersmith Odeon in London, England
- Genres: Rock And Roll, hard rock, heavy metal
- Length: 60 min
- Label: Virgin Music Video
- Producer: Motörhead

Motörhead chronology
Live in Toronto (1982)	The Birthday Party (1985)	Deaf Not Blind (1986)

Professional ratings
Review scores
Source	Rating
AllMusic	2.5/5 stars

The Birthday Party is a 1985 live video by Motörhead. It features the band's 10th anniversary show at the Hammersmith Odeon in London, England. During the performance of "Motörhead" the band were joined onstage by all of the past members (with the exception of Larry Wallis, who appeared at the first of the two anniversary shows but not at the second, which was when the concert was recorded), and Thin Lizzy bassist Phil Lynott.

It was also released in CD format in 1990 by Enigma Records, albeit with an edited track listing and running order. A DVD reissue was published on 2007 by SRP.

== Critical reception ==
As per Kerrang! reviewer, the production was primarily characterized by a discernible lack of atmospheric resonance. Although the live performances in the previous year had been regarded as formidable, the video format failed to sustain that momentum. The visual narrative suffered from performative redundancy; the essential stage dynamics were established within the initial two compositions, which rendered the subsequent material superfluous. By the concluding performance of the titular track, "Motorhead", the production's pacing became problematic, as the duration significantly exceeded the limits of engaging content.Furthermore, the technical execution of the highly anticipated "all-star jam" — featuring the collective’s former members — was demonstrably substandard. Obscured by poor cinematography and inept editing (specifically the premature placement of closing credits), this pivotal historical moment failed to provide the intended viewer satisfaction, resulting in profound frustration. In light of the commercial and critical success surrounding the Orgasmatron era, the release of such a deficient product appeared strategically ill-advised. It represented a departure from the band’s established standards of quality and suggested a lack of discernment in their promotional output at that time.

== Track listing ==
Video track list
No.	Title	Writer(s)	Original Release	Length
1.	"Iron Fist"	"Lemmy" Kilmister, Eddie Clarke, Phil Taylor	1982 ~ Iron Fist
2.	"Stay Clean"	Kilmister, Clarke, Taylor	1979 ~ Overkill
3.	"The Hammer"	Kilmister, Clarke, Taylor	1980 ~ Ace of Spades
4.	"Metropolis"	Kilmister, Clarke, Taylor	1979 ~ Overkill
5.	"Mean Machine"	Kilmister, Phil Campbell, Michael "Würzel" Burston, Pete Gill	1986 ~ Orgasmatron
6.	"On the Road" (Built for Speed)	Kilmister, Campbell, Burston, Gill	1986 ~ Orgasmatron
7.	"Killed by Death"	Kilmister, Campbell, Burston, Gill	1984 ~ No Remorse
8.	"Ace of Spades"	Kilmister, Clarke, Taylor	1980 ~ Ace of Spades
9.	"Steal Your Face"	Kilmister, Campbell, Burston, Gill	1984 ~ No Remorse
10.	"Nothing Up My Sleeve"	Kilmister, Campbell, Burston, Gill	1986 ~ Orgasmatron
11.	"(We Are) The Road Crew" (Feat. The Road Crew)	Kilmister, Clarke, Taylor	1980 ~ Ace of Spades
12.	"Bite the Bullet"	Kilmister, Clarke, Taylor	1980 ~ Ace of Spades
13.	"The Chase Is Better Than the Catch"	Kilmister, Clarke, Taylor	1980 ~ Ace of Spades
14.	"No Class" (Feat. Wendy O. Williams)	Kilmister, Clarke, Taylor	1979 ~ Overkill
15.	"Overkill"	Kilmister, Clarke, Taylor	1979 ~ Overkill
16.	"Bomber"	Kilmister, Clarke, Taylor	1979 ~ Bomber
17.	"Motörhead" (Feat. Phil "Philthy Animal" Taylor, "Fast" Eddie Clarke, Brian "Robbo" Robertson, Lucas Fox (playing guitar, not drums) & Phil Lynott)	Kilmister	1977 ~ Motörhead

CD track list
No.	Title	Writer(s)	Original Release	Length
1.	"Iron Fist"	Kilmister, Clarke, Taylor	1982 ~ Iron Fist
2.	"Mean Machine"	Kilmister, Campbell, Burston, Gill	1986 ~ Orgasmatron
3.	"On the Road" (Built for Speed)	Kilmister, Campbell, Burston, Gill	1986 ~ Orgasmatron
4.	"(We Are) The Road Crew" (Feat. The Road Crew)	Kilmister, Clarke, Taylor	1980 ~ Ace of Spades
5.	"The Hammer"	Kilmister, Clarke, Taylor	1980 ~ Ace of Spades
6.	"Metropolis"	Kilmister, Clarke, Taylor	1979 ~ Overkill
7.	"Ace of Spades"	Kilmister, Clarke, Taylor	1980 ~ Ace of Spades
8.	"Steal Your Face"	Kilmister, Campbell, Burston, Gill	1984 ~ No Remorse
9.	"Nothing Up My Sleeve"	Kilmister, Campbell, Burston, Gill	1986 ~ Orgasmatron
10.	"Bite the Bullet"	Kilmister, Clarke, Taylor	1980 ~ Ace of Spades
11.	"The Chase Is Better Than the Catch"	Kilmister, Clarke, Taylor	1980 ~ Ace of Spades
12.	"No Class" (Feat. Wendy O. Williams)	Kilmister, Clarke, Taylor	1979 ~ Overkill
13.	"Killed by Death"	Kilmister, Campbell, Burston, Gill	1984 ~ No Remorse
14.	"Bomber"	Kilmister, Clarke, Taylor	1979 ~ Bomber
15.	"Motörhead" (Feat. Phil "Philthy Animal" Taylor, "Fast" Eddie Clarke, Brian "Robbo" Robertson, Lucas Fox (playing guitar, not drums) & Phil Lynott)	Kilmister	1977 ~ Motörhead

== Personnel ==
=== Band ===
- Lemmy – bass guitar, vocals
- Phil Campbell – guitar
- Würzel – guitar
- Pete Gill – drums

=== Guests ===
- "Fast" Eddie Clarke – guitar ("Motörhead")
- Brian "Robbo" Robertson – guitar ("Motörhead")
- Phil "Philthy Animal" Taylor – drums ("Motörhead")
- Lucas Fox – playing guitar, not drums ("Motörhead")
- Phil Lynott – bass guitar ("Motörhead")
- Wendy O. Williams – vocals on "No Class"
