= Aftershock (Motörhead album) =

Studio album by Motörhead
- Released: 18 October 2013
- Recorded: 2013
- Studios: NRG Studios (Hollywood, California); Sound Factory & Sunset Sound (Hollywood, California); Maple Studios (Santa Ana, California)
- Genres: Heavy metal; hard rock
- Length: 46:54
- Label: UDR
- Producer: Cameron Webb

Motörhead chronology
The Wörld Is Ours – Vol. 2: Anyplace Crazy as Anywhere Else (2012)	Aftershock (2013)	Bad Magic (2015)

Singles from Aftershock
- 1. "Crying Shame" Released: 2013

Aftershock is the twenty-first studio album by British rock band Motörhead. Originally expected to be released in mid-2013, it was released separately on 18 October in Germany, on 21 October in the rest of Europe, and on 22 October in North America and the rest of the world. It is the fourth album released under the UDR GmbH / Motörhead Music collaboration, with ADA as the distributor for the first time.

== Recording ==
In an August 2012 interview with Artisan News Service during the Rockstar Mayhem Festival tour of 2012, Motörhead drummer Mikkey Dee revealed that the band had written a number of songs already for a follow-up to 2010's The Wörld Is Yours, but that the band were continuing to write. He then went on to say that the new album would be recorded and released in 2013. In an interview with Classic Rock Revisited, Lemmy was asked about the possibility of the album consisting of all covers. Lemmy said that it had been discussed and that "it would be fun to do". He further noted that if a covers album would be made, the band's varying musical tastes would ensure a diverse track listing.

In late October 2012, it was announced that the band had made plans to enter the studio in January 2013. In addition, Cameron Webb, who had produced the previous four albums, would again return to produce the new album. The title was revealed on 18 June 2013.

== Release ==
Professional ratings
Aggregate scores
Source	Rating
Metacritic	78/100
Review scores
Source	Rating
AllMusic	3.5/5 stars
Blabbermouth	9/10
The Guardian	4/5 stars
MetalSucks	4/5 stars
Mojo	4/5 stars
Pitchfork	7.6/10
Revolver	4/5 stars
Rolling Stone	3/5 stars

Aftershock earned mostly positive reviews. Brandon Ringo of New Noise Magazine gave it a full five stars, acclaimed the album as the best Motörhead had released in 20 years, and praised its return to basics.

Sammy O'Hagar of MetalSucks commented, "Everything sounds as snarling and nasty as it always has and always will be."

"The hammer-down moments are the most satisfying", observed Mojo's Phil Alexander, "with 'End of Time', 'Death Machine' and the frenetic 'Queen of the Damned' confirming you will not hear a louder, more defiant rock 'n' roll album this year."

Hank Shteamer of Pitchfork noted that, despite the three-year gap between The Wörld Is Yours and Aftershock, the album offered nothing new. Nevertheless, he called it "deeply satisfying and frequently thrilling… In theory, what the band does might seem overfamiliar, but in practice, it's a minor miracle that they're still doing it so well."

USA Today made Aftershock its album of the week and praised Phil Campbell's contribution, saying the album contains "some of his finest work".

Reviewer Kevin Fitzpatrick remarked on the blues-influences on Aftershock, acknowledging that "[Motörhead have] worn Chuck Berry's, Robert Johnson's and Little Richard's influences on their sleeves for the entirety of their 40 year career."

Aftershock sold 11,000 copies in the United States in its first week, to land at No. 22 on the Billboard 200.

The song "Heartbreaker" was nominated for a 2015 Grammy Award for Best Metal Performance, but lost to Tenacious D's cover of Dio's "The Last in Line."

== Track listing ==
All tracks are written by Kilmister, Campbell, Dee except where noted.

CD
No.	Title	Length
1.	"Heartbreaker"	3:05
2.	"Coup de Grace"	3:45
3.	"Lost Woman Blues"	4:09
4.	"End of Time"	3:17
5.	"Do You Believe"	2:59
6.	"Death Machine"	2:37
7.	"Dust and Glass"	2:51
8.	"Going to Mexico"	2:51
9.	"Silence When You Speak to Me"	4:30
10.	"Crying Shame"	4:28
11.	"Queen of the Damned"	2:41
12.	"Knife"	2:57
13.	"Keep Your Powder Dry"	3:54
14.	"Paralyzed"	2:50
Total length:		46:57

Best Buy bonus DVD: Live at Download 2013
No.	Title	Writer(s)	Original Release	Length
1.	"I Know How to Die"		2010 ~ The Wörld Is Yours
2.	"Metropolis"	Kilmister, "Fast" Eddie Clarke, Phil "Philthy Animal" Taylor	1979 ~ Overkill
3.	"The Chase Is Better Than the Catch"	Kilmister, Clarke, Taylor	1980 ~ Ace of Spades
4.	"Going to Brazil"		1991 ~ 1916
5.	"Killed by Death"	Kilmister, Michael "Würzel" Burston, Campbell, Pete Gill	1984 ~ No Remorse
6.	"Heartbreaker" (music video)		2013 ~ Aftershock

Tour edition bonus live CD: Best of the West Coast Tour 2014
No.	Title	Writer(s)	Original Release	Length
1.	"Damage Case"	Kilmister, Clarke, Taylor	1979 ~ Overkill	3:44
2.	"Stay Clean"	Kilmister, Clarke, Taylor	1979 ~ Overkill	3:19
3.	"I Know How to Die"		2010 ~ The Wörld is Yours	2:54
4.	"Metropolis"	Kilmister, Clarke, Taylor	1979 ~ Overkill	4:00
5.	"Over the Top"	Kilmister, Clarke, Taylor	1979 ~ Bomber (Single)	2:53
6.	"The Chase Is Better Than the Catch"	Kilmister, Clarke, Taylor	1980 ~ Ace of Spades	7:35
7.	"Rock It"	Kilmister, Brian Robertson, Taylor	1983 ~ Another Perfect Day	3:28
8.	"Lost Woman Blues"		2013 ~ Aftershock	4:31
9.	"Doctor Rock"	Kilmister, Burston, Campbell, Gill	1986 ~ Orgasmatron	9:10
10.	"Just 'Cos You Got the Power"	Kilmister, Campbell, Burston, Taylor	1987 ~ Eat the Rich	6:50
11.	"Going to Brazil"	Kilmister, Campbell, Burston, Taylor	1991 ~ 1916	2:42
12.	"Killed by Death"	Kilmister, Burston, Campbell, Gill	1984 ~ No Remorse	5:19
13.	"Ace of Spades"	Kilmister, Clarke, Taylor	1980 ~ Ace of Spades	3:49
14.	"Overkill"	Kilmister, Clarke, Taylor	1979 ~ Overkill	8:30

== Personnel ==
=== Motörhead ===
- Lemmy – bass, vocals
- Phil Campbell – guitars
- Mikkey Dee – drums

=== Production ===
- Cameron Webb – production, mixing, engineering
- Sergio Chavez – assistant engineering
- Kris Glddens – assistant engineering
- Steve Olmon – assistant engineering
- Geoff Neal – assistant engineering
- Chris Claypool – assistant engineering
- Alan Douches – mastering
- Motörhead – executive production
- Terje Aspmo – cover art
- Lemmy – sketch art
- Steffan Chirazi – creative direction
- Kai Swillus – creative direction
- Robert John – photography

=== Best of the West Coast Tour 2014 ===
- Cameron Webb – recording
- Andrew Alekiel – mastering
- Ray Ahner – photography

== Charts ==
Chart (2013)	Peak position
Austrian Albums (Ö3 Austria)	7
Belgian Albums (Ultratop Flanders)	37
Belgian Albums (Ultratop Wallonia)	26
Canadian Albums (Billboard)	22
Danish Albums (Hitlisten)	14
Dutch Albums (Album Top 100)	64
Finnish Albums (Suomen virallinen lista)	5
French Albums (SNEP)	14
German Albums (Offizielle Top 100)	5
Italian Albums (FIMI)	24
New Zealand Albums (RMNZ)	33
Norwegian Albums (VG-lista)	6
Polish Albums (ZPAV)	47
Spanish Albums (Promusicae)	23
Swedish Albums (Sverigetopplistan)	8
Swiss Albums (Schweizer Hitparade)	6
UK Independent Albums (Official Charts)	11
UK Rock & Metal Albums (Official Charts)	10
US Billboard 200	22
US Top Hard Rock Albums (Billboard)	3
US Independent Albums (Billboard)	2
US Top Rock Albums (Billboard)	8
US Indie Store Album Sales (Billboard)	5

== Certifications ==
Certifications for Aftershock
Region	Certification	Certified units/sales
Germany (BVMI)	Gold	100,000^{‡}
^{‡} Sales+streaming figures based on certification alone.
