= Bad Magic =

2015 studio album by Motörhead

Studio album by Motörhead
- Released: 28 August 2015
- Recorded: 2015
- Studios: NRG Studio (Hollywood, California); Maple Studios (Santa Ana, California); Grandmaster Studios
- Genres: Heavy metal; hard rock
- Length: 42:57
- Label: UDR
- Producer: Cameron Webb

Motörhead chronology
Aftershock (2013)	Bad Magic (2015)	Clean Your Clock (2016)

Motörhead studio album chronology
Aftershock (2013)	Bad Magic (2015)	The Manticore Tapes (2025)

Bad Magic is the twenty-second and final studio album by the British rock band Motörhead. Released on 28 August 2015, it is the fifth release under the UDR / Motörhead Music collaboration of the previous five years.

Due to the death of founder Lemmy four months after the album's release, the band disbanded after 40 years on the road. Surviving members guitarist Phil Campbell and drummer Mikkey Dee stated to numerous media that the band was finished.

"When the Sky Comes Looking for You" was the only song from this album to be played live. In 2016, the album received an ECHO Award nomination for Best Rock/Alternative International, but eventually lost to Iron Maiden's The Book of Souls.

== Recording ==
Bad Magic was written and recorded in Los Angeles, and Cameron Webb again produced the album. In an interview, Motörhead drummer Mikkey Dee told the press that the recording process was different than previously:

"[...] this time we were in a recording studio writing the album and all playing it together, actually. Before, we used to be in a rehearsal studio, write the songs and then we'd go in and record it one at a time, but here we kind of recorded it live, right away, as we had the song. We used to write very spontaneous, and this is probably even more spontaneous than any [previous] Motörhead [album]. But we really do enjoy the album. And it's a very live, very spontaneous record. I think that works best for us."

Later Lemmy said the whole album was not recorded live, but they:

"[...] did about five tracks all together, so that much is true."

The cover of "Sympathy for the Devil" was recorded at the request of pro wrestler Triple H.

The band also recorded a cover of David Bowie's "Heroes" during the recording sessions for the album and it was one of the band's last songs recorded together prior to Lemmy's death that same year. The song would be released two years later on 2017's Under Cöver album.

On 1 December 2022, an expanded edition of the album, Seriously Bad Magic, was announced for release on Silver Lining Records on 24 February 2023, containing "'Heroes'" and two unreleased tracks from the sessions, "Bullet in Your Brain" (which was released as a single to promote the new edition) and "Greedy Bastards". The CD release will also include a live album, Sayonara Folks!, recorded at the Mt. Fuji Rock Festival in 2015, and a box set will contain both releases plus a bonus interview disc, Lemmy: War, Love, Death and Injustice.

== Critical reception ==
Professional ratings
Aggregate scores
Source	Rating
Metacritic	80/100
Review scores
Source	Rating
AllMusic	3.5/5 stars
Blabbermouth.net	8.5/10
The Boston Globe	favourable
Consequence of Sound	B
The Guardian	4/5 stars
Loudwire	favourable
Metal Storm	9.2/10
Record Collector	3/4 stars
AntiHero Magazine	9/10 stars
RockRevolt Magazine	4/5 stars
Sputnikmusic	3.5/5

Bad Magic received a Metacritic score of 80 out of 100, indicating generally positive reviews from critics. Chad Bowar of Loudwire wrote that the songs on the album had a timeless sound, meaning that listeners wouldn't know if they were written during the year the album was released or in the early '80s.

Ray Van Horn Jr. from Blabbermouth.net, noted that with Bad Magic, given Lemmy's health problems:

"[they're] on the verge of what might be [their] swan song...[Lemmy] exhibits the vocal wear and tear of a man whose long-beaten, gravelly pipes are betraying him due to a natural aging process."

However, he continues that:

"Lemmy is a freak of nature, and it's great to hear him ralph, croon and snarl with a give-a-damn will to live—you're a total piece of crap if you knock a guy who has given us his all for decades."

Sean Barry of Consequence of Sound points to the song, "Till the End", and writes that:

"[...] here the frontman relates his story and woes in some rundown pub on the outskirts of town. It also finds Lemmy coming to terms with who he is, and despite all his flaws, pledging to continue living as he has through the remainder of his life. And while the 70 years of said hell-raising show in the way he slightly slurs his vocals, he's just as virile and robust as he was on Overkill."

Barry ends the review writing:

"'Bad Magic' feels ancestral; you can feel it in your blood and in your bones. Even for those new to Motörhead, the album will have the power to recharge your love for all things rock 'n' roll. As a band that's been around for generations, Motörhead isn't just hanging around trying to keep themselves relevant. They're partying until the sun goes out and celebrating their own immortality."

== Commercial performance ==
The album debuted on the Billboard 200 at No. 35, No. 2 on the Hard Rock Albums chart, and No. 5 on the Rock Albums chart, selling 10,325 copies in its first week. The album has sold 36,000 copies in the United States as of June 2016.

== Track listing ==
All tracks are written by Kilmister, Campbell, Dee except where noted.

CD
No.	Title	Writer(s)	Length
1.	"Victory or Die"		3:09
2.	"Thunder & Lightning"		3:06
3.	"Fire Storm Hotel"		3:35
4.	"Shoot Out All of Your Lights"		3:15
5.	"The Devil"		2:54
6.	"Electricity"		2:17
7.	"Evil Eye"		2:20
8.	"Teach Them How to Bleed"		3:13
9.	"Till the End"		4:05
10.	"Tell Me Who to Kill"		2:57
11.	"Choking on Your Screams"		3:33
12.	"When the Sky Comes Looking for You"		2:58
13.	"Sympathy for the Devil" (the Rolling Stones cover)	Jagger/Richards	5:35
Total length:			42:57

Bonus tracks (Bad Magic: Seriously Bad Magic) – 2023
No.	Title	Writer(s)	Length
14.	"'Heroes'" (David Bowie cover)	David Bowie, Brian Eno	4:36
15.	"Bullet in Your Brain"		3:17
16.	"Greedy Bastards"		4:12

Note: "'Heroes'" was previously released on Under Cöver (2017).

== Personnel ==
Motörhead

- Lemmy – vocals, bass
- Phil Campbell – guitars, piano on "Sympathy for the Devil"
- Mikkey Dee – drums

Additional musicians

- Jimmi Mayweather and Nick Agee – backing vocals on "Shoot Out All of Your Lights'"
- Brian May – guitar solo on "The Devil"

Production

- Cameron Webb – producer, mixing, engineer
- Sergio Chavez – engineer
- Nick Agee – engineer
- Mike Sassano – engineer
- Kyle McAulay – engineer
- Michael Fernandez – engineer
- Michael Eckes – engineer
- Robin Florent – engineer
- Kris Fredriksson – engineer ("The Devil" and Todd Campbell on "Victory or Die" and "Evil Eye")
- Motörhead – executive producers
- Lemmy – cover design concept, doodles
- Mark DeVito – cover art direction, design
- Steffan Chirazi – creative direction, booklet design
- Kai Swillus – creative direction, booklet design
- Robert John – photography

== Charts ==
=== Weekly charts ===
Chart (2015)	Peak position
Australian Albums (ARIA)	29
Austrian Albums (Ö3 Austria)	1
Belgian Albums (Ultratop Flanders)	9
Belgian Albums (Ultratop Wallonia)	12
Canadian Albums (Billboard)	10
Croatian International Albums (HDU)	2
Czech Albums (ČNS IFPI)	4
Dutch Albums (Album Top 100)	7
Finnish Albums (Suomen virallinen lista)	1
French Albums (SNEP)	16
German Albums (Offizielle Top 100)	1
Hungarian Albums (MAHASZ)	16
Irish Albums (IRMA)	43
Italian Albums (FIMI)	12
Japanese Albums (Oricon)	67
New Zealand Albums (RMNZ)	25
Norwegian Albums (VG-lista)	7
Polish Albums (ZPAV)	32
Scottish Albums (Official Charts)	8
Spanish Albums (Promusicae)	23
Swedish Albums (Sverigetopplistan)	3
Swiss Albums (Schweizer Hitparade)	2
UK Albums (Official Charts)	10
UK Album Downloads (Official Charts)	28
UK Independent Albums (Official Charts)	1
UK Rock & Metal Albums (Official Charts)	1
US Billboard 200	35
US Top Hard Rock Albums (Billboard)	3
US Independent Albums (Billboard)	2
US Top Rock Albums (Billboard)	5
US Indie Store Album Sales (Billboard)	5

=== Year-end charts ===
Chart (2015)	Position
German Albums (Offizielle Top 100)	71

- Regarding French sales, the SNEP gives Bad Magic's highest position as 14.

== Certifications ==
Certifications for Bad Magic
Region	Certification	Certified units/sales
Germany (BVMI)	Gold	100,000^{‡}
^{‡} Sales+streaming figures based on certification alone.
