= The Wörld Is Yours =

Studio album by Motörhead
- Released: 14 December 2010
- Recorded: 2010
- Studio: NRG Studios (Hollywood, California); Maple Studios (Santa Ana, California); Sage and Sound Studios (Hollywood, California)
- Genre: Heavy metal
- Length: 39:09
- Label: Motörhead Music; UDR / EMI
- Producer: Cameron Webb

Motörhead chronology
Motörizer (2008)	The Wörld Is Yours (2010)	The Wörld Is Ours - Vol. 1: Everywhere Further Than Everyplace Else (2011)

Singles from The Wörld Is Yours
- 1. "Get Back in Line" Released: 5 December 2010

The Wörld Is Yours is the twentieth studio album by British rock band Motörhead, released on 14 December 2010 as an exclusive edition, and a month later on 17 January 2011 as a standard release. It is dedicated by Lemmy to Ronnie James Dio who had died from cancer seven months earlier.

It was the first album with the UDR GmbH label of Germany and distribution by the EMI label in most territories, as Motörhead Music made a comeback in production also.

== Recording ==
The album was first released as an ecolbook, part of a special edition of Future PLC's Classic Rock magazine, which featured interviews with the band and the band's history. The standard CD release of The Wörld Is Yours was released worldwide several weeks later through Motörhead's own label, Motörhead Music, distributed by EMI Label Services. The album would subsequently be released in North America on 8 February 2011. Two special editions of the album were also announced. The first featured the album bundled with a bonus live DVD featuring a performance from the 2006 Wacken Open Air festival in Germany and an exclusive T-shirt. The second version featured those contents along with a signed copy of the album on silver vinyl.

== Release ==
The band embarked on a world tour to promote the album. This included dates in the UK starting on 8 November 2010, a 27 date headlining tour of North America from January to March 2011 and a four-date Australian tour in late March. In addition, a single, Get Back in Line was released to promote the album. Subsequently a video for the track was released on 6 December 2010.

As part of the effort to promote The Wörld Is Yours in the US, the band made appearances on Conan O'Brien's late-night talk show Conan, and the NBC late night show Late Night with Jimmy Fallon, playing "Get Back in Line" at both appearances.

== Reception ==
Professional ratings
Aggregate scores
Source	Rating
Metacritic	70/100
Review scores
Source	Rating
AllMusic	3.5/5 stars
Classic Rock	8/10 stars
Daily Express	3/5
The Guardian	3/5 stars
Metal Hammer	(6/7)
The Daily Telegraph	4/5 stars
Blabbermouth	7/10

The album has received mainly positive reviews, with most reviewers citing the album as very similar to most of Motörhead's past works due to the band essentially following the same formula.

Eduardo Rivadavia of AllMusic reviewed the album positively and commented that it may be remembered as Motörhead's "ultimate 'rock & roll' album". Rivadavia cited I Know How to Die and Outlaw as the best tracks from the album.

Express.co.uk summed up the album as being "every bit as noisy and scary as anything they've produced over their 35 years". Dom Lawson of the UK magazine Classic Rock considers The Wörld Is Yours "one of the finest of the lot" of 20 albums the band produced, praising the production skills of Cameron Webb and the band in "supreme form (...) as they blaze through some of their strongest material in years".

On the other hand, Alexis Petridis of the Guardian said those who purchase the album will not do so "in the hope of being surprised or baffled".

== Track listing ==
All lyrics are written by Lemmy; all music is composed by Lemmy, Phil Campbell, Mikkey Dee.

CD
No.	Title	Length
1.	"Born to Lose"	4:01
2.	"I Know How to Die"	3:19
3.	"Get Back in Line"	3:35
4.	"Devils in My Head"	4:21
5.	"Rock 'n' Roll Music"	4:25
6.	"Waiting for the Snake"	3:41
7.	"Brotherhood of Man"	5:15
8.	"Outlaw"	3:30
9.	"I Know What You Need"	2:58
10.	"Bye Bye Bitch Bye Bye"	4:04
Total length:		39:09

== Personnel ==
Adapted from the album's liner notes.

=== Motörhead ===
- Lemmy – bass, vocals
- Phil Campbell – guitars
- Mikkey Dee – drums
- Charlie Paulson – scratch guitar

=== Production ===
- Produced, mixed & engineered – Cameron Webb
- Engineering – Sergio Chavez, Wesley Mischener & Josh Bierly
- Recorded – NRG Studios, North Hollywood, LA; Maple Studios, Santa Ana, California; Sage and Sound, Los Angeles during early 2010

All of Campbell's guitars were recorded by Romesh Dodangoda and assisted by Rob Thomas, at Long Wave Studio, Cardiff, Wales

- Studio Techs – Francis Ruiz, Jimmy Bomann & Steve Luna
- Mastering – Ted Jenson at Sterling Sound
- Mixing – Sarm Studios, London
- Album Design – Lemmy (sketch art & cover concept), Mark DeVito (layout/graphic design & cover concept), Steffan Chirazi (creative direction), Robert John & Pep Bonet (photography)

== Charts ==
Chart (2010)	Peak position
Austrian Albums (Ö3 Austria)	34
Canadian Albums (Billboard)	24
Finnish Albums (Suomen virallinen lista)	15
French Albums (SNEP)	89
German Albums (Offizielle Top 100)	25
Greek Albums (IFPI)	46
Japanese Albums (Oricon)	115
Norwegian Albums (VG-lista)	40
Scottish Albums (OCC)	42
Spanish Albums (Promusicae)	87
Swedish Albums (Sverigetopplistan)	24
Swiss Albums (Schweizer Hitparade)	24
UK Albums (OCC)	45
UK Rock & Metal Albums (OCC)	1
US Billboard 200	94
US Top Hard Rock Albums (Billboard)	4
US Independent Albums (Billboard)	12
US Top Rock Albums (Billboard)	24
US Indie Store Album Sales (Billboard)	5
