= Kiss of Death (Motörhead album) =

Studio album by Motörhead
- Released: 29 August 2006
- Recorded: 2006
- Studios: Paramount Studios and NRG Studios, Hollywood, California; Maple Studios, Costa Mesa, California
- Genre: Heavy metal
- Length: 44:54 (standard); 50:05 (BT version)
- Labels: SPV/Steamhammer (Europe); Sanctuary (US)
- Producer: Cameron Webb

Motörhead chronology
BBC Live & In-Session (2005)	Kiss of Death (2006)	The Essential Motörhead (2007)

Kiss of Death is the eighteenth studio album by the English rock band Motörhead, released on 29 August 2006 via Steamhammer, their ninth with the label.

== Recording ==
Kiss of Death was the second album Motörhead recorded with producer Cameron Webb and continues the heavy sound on the band's previous album Inferno. As Joel McIver noted in his 2011 Motörhead memoir Overkill: The Untold Story of Motörhead:

"'God Was Never on Your Side' showcases Lemmy's lyrical doom-mongering as never before; 'Kingdom of the Worm' — the album's lead single — was an acerbic commentary on the modern world; and one song, the ponderous 'Going Down,' was co-authored by Campbell's son Todd."

Mike Inez from Alice in Chains and C.C. Deville from Poison also played on the album. "Kingdom of the Worm" received its world premiere on Friday, 19 May, during Lemmy's appearance on the "Jonesy's Jukebox" radio show on Indie 103.1 FM.

== Release ==
Kiss of Death reached No. 4 in Germany, marking Motörhead's highest entry ever in the German charts. The album is also notable for being the final Motörhead album to feature original artwork by longtime artist Joe Petagno.

== Critical reception ==
Professional ratings
Review scores
Source	Rating
AllMusic	3.5/5 stars
Blabbermouth	8/10
Drowned in Sound	8/10
The Encyclopedia of Popular Music	3/5 stars
MusicOMH	4/5 stars
NOW Magazine	(favourable)
PopMatters	7/10
Rock Hard	8.5/10

A review on Drowned in Sound thought Motörhead is not a band that focuses on innovation and progression and that they are happy doing more of the same and their fans are more than happy to receive it, this album being no exception. Otherwise the review notes the tracks are "twelve slices of good old-fashioned, foot-stomping, fist-pumping rock 'n' roll." Greg Prato of AllMusic praised the band's longevity but felt "there are too many songs that sound like run-of-the-mill modern-day metal (such as 'Living in the Past' and 'Sword of Glory'), rather than the classic Motörhead sound you'd expect." But Lee Marlow of Classic Rock, on "Sword of Glory", said "Lemmy's ability to wring fresh poignancy from the idiocy of war and its mark on history has long been one of Motörhead's sharpest weapons."

== Track listing ==
All tracks are written by Lemmy Kilmister, Phil Campbell, Mikkey Dee except where noted.

CD
No.	Title	Writer(s)	Length
1.	"Sucker"		2:59
2.	"One Night Stand"		3:05
3.	"Devil I Know"		3:00
4.	"Trigger"		3:53
5.	"Under the Gun"		4:44
6.	"God Was Never on Your Side"		4:20
7.	"Living in the Past"		3:45
8.	"Christine"		3:42
9.	"Sword of Glory"		3:57
10.	"Be My Baby"		3:40
11.	"Kingdom of the Worm"		4:08
12.	"Going Down"	Kilmister, Campbell, Dee, Todd Campbell	3:35
Total length:			44:54

Sanctuary bonus track
No.	Title	Writer(s)	Length
13.	"R.A.M.O.N.E.S." (2006 Version)	Kilmister, Campbell, Michael "Würzel" Burston, Phil "Philthy Animal" Taylor	1:22

- Re-recorded with Mikkey Dee on drums

SPV limited edition bonus track
No.	Title	Writer(s)	Length
13.	"Whiplash"	James Hetfield, Lars Ulrich	3:49

- This limited-edition release was in a tri-fold digipak sleeve, with an artwork poster. The booklet differed slightly from that of the standard release in that there was no brickwork surrounding the central image, just a black border.

== Personnel ==
Credits adapted from the album's liner notes.

- Lemmy – lead vocals, bass
- Phil Campbell – lead guitar
- Mikkey Dee – drums

Additional musicians

- C.C. DeVille – guitar solo on "God Was Never on Your Side"
- Mike Inez – additional bass guitar on "Under the Gun"
- Zoltán "Zoli" Téglás – additional backing vocals on "God Was Never on Your Side"

Production

- Cameron Webb – producer, mixing, engineer
- Bob Kulick – producer ("Whiplash")
- Bruce Bouillet – producer ("Whiplash")
- Sergio Chavez – additional engineering
- Kevin Bartley – mastering
- Lemmy – sketches and handwriting
- Steffan Chirazi – creative direction
- Mark Abramson – art direction and design
- Robert John – photography
- Michael Shreiber – Latin translation
- Joe Petagno – album cover, Snaggletooth

== Charts ==
Weekly chart performance
Chart (2006)	Peak position
Austrian Albums (Ö3 Austria)	20
Belgian Albums (Ultratop Flanders)	82
Dutch Albums (Album Top 100)	64
Finnish Albums (Suomen virallinen lista)	16
French Albums (SNEP)	37
German Albums (Offizielle Top 100)	4
Italian Albums (FIMI)	42
Japan Oricon Albums	203
Scottish Albums (Official Charts)	37
Swedish Albums (Sverigetopplistan)	13
Swiss Albums (Schweizer Hitparade)	26
UK Albums (Official Charts)	45
UK Rock & Metal Albums (Official Charts)	3
US Heatseekers Albums (Billboard)	10
US Independent Albums (Billboard)	20

Weekly chart performance
Chart (2026)	Peak position
Croatian International Albums (HDU)	23
