= Motörizer =

Studio album by Motörhead
- Released: 26 August 2008
- Recorded: Late 2007 – early 2008
- Studio: Studio 606 and Sage & Sound
- Genre: Heavy metal
- Length: 38:55
- Label: SPV/Steamhammer
- Producer: Cameron Webb

Motörhead chronology
Better Motörhead than Dead: Live at Hammersmith (2007)	Motörizer (2008)	The Wörld Is Yours (2010)

Motörizer is the nineteenth studio album by British rock band Motörhead. It was released on 26 August 2008, their eleventh and last on the Steamhammer label.

== Recording ==
Recording took place at end of 2007 and the beginning of 2008. As with all their albums since 2004's Inferno, it was produced, mixed and engineered by Cameron Webb.

== Release ==
Lemmy appeared on BBC 6 Music's radio programme, Bruce Dickinson's Friday Rock Show on 11 July 2008, to promote the album, playing the track "Runaround Man", which he described as:

"nonsense set to an infectious beat."

He also played "Rock Out" and "The Thousand Names of God", about which he said:

"It's completely extraneous, the title... It's about soldiers being conned into going into battle, for like, business men. It isn't even a cause anymore."

The band's lead single "Rock Out" was featured as the official theme song to WWE Unforgiven, and was used in the films Hesher and Nitro Circus: The Movie.

== Artwork ==
The album cover was revealed on the front page of the group's official website on 11 June 2008. Notable for being the band's first album since Overnight Sensation (1996) without the artwork of long-time collaborator Joe Petagno, the cover artwork is by Mark De Vito and features a Motörhead-themed coat of arms, with the shield quartered for each band member: the Royal Arms of England for Lemmy in the top left corner: the Draig Goch of Wales for Phil Campbell in the bottom right corner, the Tre Kronor of Sweden for Mikkey Dee in the bottom left corner, and Snaggletooth (the band's mascot) for the band as a whole.

== Reception ==
Professional ratings
Aggregate scores
Source	Rating
Metacritic	63%
Review scores
Source	Rating
AllMusic	3.5/5 stars
Metal Hammer	10/10 stars
Pitchfork Media	7.2/10
PopMatters	7/10 stars
World of Music	4.5/5 stars
Blabbermouth	8/10
The Guardian	3/5 stars

The album was met with mostly positive reviews on release. Alex Henderson of Allmusic gave the album a positive review, saying that "the classic Motörhead sound prevails, and forceful, in-your-face tracks such as "Buried Alive", "Runaround Man", "When the Eagle Screams", and "Time Is Right" sound like they could have been recorded 25 years earlier. Motorizer never pretends to be groundbreaking, but if the material is predictable, it is engagingly predictable." Cosmo Lee of Pitchfork Media gave a positive review, saying that it was an improvements over recent Motorhead albums and that: "Motörizer avoids the bland hard rock that larded up some of the band's recent records. Instead, its 11 tracks efficiently clock in at under 39 minutes. Lemmy turns 63 this year, but he still sounds half his age."

The album reached number 32 on the UK Albums Chart, making it the band's highest-charting album in the UK since 1916 in 1991. The album debuted on Billboard chart at No. 82. It peaked at No. 2 on the UK Rock & Metal chart, and at No. 5 on the German 'Offizielle Top 100' & US Independent charts. As with the band's last few albums, it did not make a massive impact on the general public, but saw dedicated sales in markets where they had a strong following. "We've never had a hit in America", remarked Lemmy. "We actually got in the top 100 this time… Number 89 [sic] and straight out again, but it's a start."

== Track listing ==
All tracks are written by Kilmister, Campbell, Dee.

No.	Title	Length
1.	"Runaround Man"	2:57
2.	"Teach You How to Sing the Blues"	3:03
3.	"When the Eagle Screams"	3:44
4.	"Rock Out"	2:08
5.	"One Short Life"	4:05
6.	"Buried Alive"	3:12
7.	"English Rose"	3:34
8.	"Back on the Chain"	3:24
9.	"Heroes"	4:59
10.	"Time Is Right"	3:14
11.	"The Thousand Names of God"	4:33
Total length:		38:55

== Personnel ==
=== Motörhead ===
- Lemmy – vocals, bass
- Phil Campbell – guitars
- Mikkey Dee – drums
- Wesley Mishener – slide guitar on "The Thousand Names of God"

=== Production ===
- Cameron Webb – producer, mixing, engineer
- Sergio Chavez – assistant engineer
- John Lousteau – assistant engineer
- Wesley Mischener – assistant engineer
- Josh Bierly – assistant engineer
- Kevin Bartley – mastering
- Lemmy – cover concept and inside digipak art
- Robert John – photography
- Mark De Vito – illustration
- Steffan Chirazi – creative direction
- Mark Abramson – art direction, graphic design

== Charts ==
Chart (2008)	Peak position
Austrian Albums (Ö3 Austria)	13
Belgian Albums (Ultratop Flanders)	55
Belgian Albums (Ultratop Wallonia)	70
Danish Albums (Hitlisten)	20
Dutch Albums (Album Top 100)	58
Finnish Albums (Suomen virallinen lista)	9
French Albums (SNEP)	24
German Albums (Offizielle Top 100)	5
Hungarian Albums (MAHASZ)	16
Italian Albums (FIMI)	47
Japanese Albums (Oricon)	117
Norwegian Albums (VG-lista)	11
Scottish Albums (OCC)	43
Swedish Albums (Sverigetopplistan)	10
Swiss Albums (Schweizer Hitparade)	11
UK Albums (OCC)	32
UK Rock & Metal Albums (OCC)	2
US Billboard 200	82
US Top Hard Rock Albums (Billboard)	11
US Independent Albums (Billboard)	5
US Indie Store Album Sales (Billboard)	14

== Release history ==
Country	Date
North America	26 August 2008
Germany	29 August 2008
Europe	1 September 2008
