= No Class =

Single by Motörhead

from the album Overkill
- B-side: "Like a Nightmare"
- Released: 15 June 1979
- Recorded: December 1978 – January 1979; Roundhouse Studios; Sound Development Studios
- Genre: Heavy metal
- Length: 2:39
- Label: Bronze Records/EMI
- Songwriters: Eddie Clarke; Ian Kilmister; Phil Taylor
- Producer: Jimmy Miller

Motörhead singles chronology
"Overkill" (1979)	"No Class" (1979)	"Bomber" (1979)

"No Class" is a song by the British heavy metal band Motörhead. It was released in 1979 in 7" vinyl pressings. The song first appeared on the 1979 album Overkill, and became one of the "cornerstones" of the classic 1981 live album No Sleep 'til Hammersmith. It is one of the band's "anthems".

== Release ==
It was available in three different covers, with a picture of Lemmy, "Fast" Eddie Clarke or Phil "Philthy Animal" Taylor. The single also contains the B-side "Like a Nightmare", which can be found on the reissued versions of Overkill. The song was already a live track before it was recorded for Overkill.

== Style and influences ==
Stylistically, the song is described as "get-down rock boogie". Critics have noted the similarities at the time between Motörhead's music and ZZ Top's, and the guitar riff in "No Class" is said to be "stolen" from ZZ Top's "Tush."

On Motörhead's 1999 live album Everything Louder than Everyone Else, before playing "No Class" Lemmy dedicated the song to long-time friend Wendy O. Williams, who had committed suicide the previous month.

== Notable covers ==
- The Plasmatics covered the song in 1982, as part of the Stand by Your Man EP collaboration with Motörhead.
- In 1990 the Argentine Thrash metal band Hermética recorded "No Class" for Intérpretes, a cover album; it is the only English track ever recorded by the band.
- In 2010, the sludge metal band Kingdom of Sorrow covered the song on their album Behind the Blackest Tears.
- In 2012, founding thrash metal band Megadeth covered the song on their Gigantour after Motörhead had to pull out of the last 4 shows. Lemmy had a combination of a viral upper respiratory infection and a voice strain.

== Single track listing ==
1. "No Class" (Eddie Clarke, Ian Kilmister, Phil Taylor)
2. "Like a Nightmare" (Kilmister, Clarke, Taylor)

== Personnel ==
- Ian "Lemmy" Kilmister – bass, lead vocals
- "Fast" Eddie Clarke – guitar, backing vocals
- Phil "Philthy Animal" Taylor – drums
