= Ace of Spades (song) =

1980 song by Motörhead

Single by Motörhead

from the album Ace of Spades
- B-side: "Dirty Love"
- Released: 17 October 1980
- Recorded: 4 August – 15 September 1980
- Studio: Jackson's Studios, Rickmansworth, England
- Genre: Heavy metal; speed metal
- Length: 2:48
- Label: Bronze
- Songwriters: Eddie Clarke; Lemmy; Phil Taylor
- Producer: Vic Maile

Motörhead singles chronology
| "Bomber" (1979) | "Ace of Spades" (1980) | "Motorhead" (1981) |

Music video
- "Ace of Spades" on YouTube

Alternative cover
- Christmas picture sleeve edition

"Ace of Spades" is a song by English heavy metal band Motörhead and the title track to the album Ace of Spades. It was released as a single in October 1980.

In 2021, Eli Enis of Revolver included the song in his list of the "15 Greatest Album-Opening Songs in Metal".

== Overview ==
Initially issued as a 7" vinyl single in October 1980 as a preview to the album Ace of Spades and autumn tour, the song was also released by Bronze Records as a 12" vinyl pressing in special Christmas picture sleeves, limited to 50,000 copies. The picture of the band in Santa outfits used on the cover was taken at the Aylesbury Fair, while the band were on tour.

Bronze also issued German and Spanish 7" vinyl versions which had a different sleeves, as well as a Japanese release, with a colour picture insert with song lyrics in English and Japanese. One sided test pressings (not mis-presses, but used in the trade) escaped the pressing plant and are on the market.

The song opens with an overdriven bass intro played by Lemmy. For the lyrics, he said he "used gambling metaphors, mostly cards and dice—when it comes to that sort of thing, I'm more into the one-arm bandits actually, but you can't really sing about spinning fruit, and the wheels coming down".

On 6 September 1980, Lemmy was interviewed by Graham Neale on BBC Radio 1's Rock on Saturday show, and "Bomber", "Ace of Spades" and "Love Me Like a Reptile" were played. The following month, on 6 and 20 October, the band played the song on BBC TV show Top of the Pops.

== Commercial success ==
The song spent 13 weeks in the UK Singles Chart, and originally peaked at number 15 upon its initial release. At the midweek point in January 2016 it reached No. 9 and in the official Friday chart they reached number 13, following the death of frontman Lemmy in December 2015 and subsequent dissolution of the band. It has sold 208,830 digital copies as of January 2016. It reached the top of the UK Rock & Metal Singles and Albums Charts on 9 January 2016. "Ace of Spades" has also featured in adverts for Pot Noodle (Computer Graphic), IKEA and Kronenbourg 1664.

== Critical reception ==
The song – which "put a choke on the British music charts and proved to all that a band could succeed without sacrificing its blunt power and speed" – is considered the definitive Motörhead anthem, albeit not by Lemmy. "I don't see the song that way at all," he said in 2000. "I believe we've done our best work since Eddie left the band in 1982."

In March 2005, Q placed it at No. 27 in a list of the 100 Greatest Guitar Tracks, stating, "This song has an intro which wouldn't be out of place ushering in the end of the world." In 2009, it was named the tenth greatest hard rock song of all time by VH1.

In 2012, Loudwire ranked the song number one on their list of the top 10 Motörhead songs, and in 2021, Louder Sound ranked the song number two on their list of the top 50 Motörhead songs.

In 2014, NME ranked it number 155 in a list of The 500 Greatest Songs of All Time.

In May 2019, "Ace of Spades" was named the favorite poker-themed song in a survey of 1,000 customers of online poker site PokerStars. The song reportedly "not only won, but crushed" the other finalist, "Poker Face" by Lady Gaga.

It was ranked No. 442 on Rolling Stone's "Top 500 Best Songs of All Time". The same magazine also ranked the song number three on their list of the 100 greatest heavy metal songs.

== Track listing ==
1. "Ace of Spades" (Ian Kilmister, Eddie Clarke, Phil Taylor) – 2:49
2. "Dirty Love" (Kilmister, Clarke, Taylor) – 2:57

== Personnel ==
- Lemmy – bass, vocals
- "Fast" Eddie Clarke – guitars
- Phil "Philthy Animal" Taylor – drums

== Certifications ==
| Region | Certification | Certified units/sales |
|---|---|---|
| New Zealand (RMNZ) | Platinum | 30,000^{‡} |
| Spain (Promusicae) | Gold | 30,000^{‡} |
| United Kingdom (BPI) | Platinum | 600,000^{‡} |
^{‡} Sales+streaming figures based on certification alone.

== Live version ==
"Ace of Spades (live)"

Single by Motörhead

from the album No Sleep at All
- B-side: "Dogs"; "Traitor"
- Released: 1988
- Recorded: 2 July 1988
- Venue: Hämeenlinna "Giants of Rock" Festival, Finland
- Length: 2:51
- Label: GWR
- Songwriters: Eddie Clarke; Lemmy; Phil Taylor
- Producers: Motörhead; Guy Bidmead

Motörhead singles chronology
| "Eat the Rich" (1987) | "Ace of Spades (live)" (1988) | "The One to Sing the Blues" (1990) |

"Ace of Spades (live)" is a 1988 7-inch vinyl release of the song by Motörhead. The single has no picture sleeve; it was issued (and withdrawn) in a plain white paper cover. All three songs on the single appeared on the band's No Sleep at All live album, which was recorded at the Giants of Rock Festival in Hämeenlinna, Finland on 2 July 1988.

The band had wanted "Traitor" as the A-side, but "Ace of Spades" was chosen instead, when the band noticed the change, they refused to allow the single to be distributed to the shops. So despite the popularity the song had achieved, this single was not as successful as the original version, which reached No. 15 in the UK Singles Chart in 1980, as it became only available at gigs and through the Motörheadbangers fan club.

The song became a staple of the band's live set, with Lemmy acknowledging that despite becoming "sick" of performing it, they "can't ditch Ace of Spades, it wouldn't be right. If I go to see Little Richard, I expect to hear Good Golly Miss Molly, or I'd be pissed off". However, Lemmy softened his view on performing Ace of Spades live later on, saying "I used to have that thought occasionally, but I killed it. "Ace of Spades" has been really good to us, and it's one of the best songs that I ever wrote. So I suppose you have to put up with it, because everybody wants to hear it, every night." Live versions have appeared on the albums No Sleep 'til Hammersmith (1981), Nö Sleep at All (1988), Everything Louder than Everyone Else (1999), Live at Brixton Academy (2003), Better Motörhead than Dead: Live at Hammersmith (2007), The Wörld Is Ours - Vol. 1: Everywhere Further Than Everyplace Else (2011), The Wörld Is Ours - Vol. 2: Anyplace Crazy as Anywhere Else (2012), and Clean Your Clock (2016).

It was the first song that Phil Campbell and Würzel played with the band – on the "Bambi" episode of The Young Ones. The line-up is particularly rare until 1987: Lemmy, Campbell, Würzel and Taylor. Taylor had already left the band by the time the filming started, but kept to his promise of making the performance.

In September 1993, WGAF Records re-released the original 1980s track on CD-single, cassette single, 12" vinyl picture sleeve and picture disc versions, the song was coupled with "Louie Louie", "Dirty Love", and "Ace of Spades (The CCN Remix)", and although the band were not too pleased with the CCN Remix version, this single peaked at No. 23 in the UK chart.

=== Single track listing ===
1. "Ace of Spades" (Lemmy, Eddie Clarke, Phil Taylor)
2. "Dogs" (Lemmy, Würzel, Phil Campbell, Taylor)
3. "Traitor" (Lemmy, Würzel, Campbell, Taylor)

== See also ==
- Ace of spades
- Dead man's hand
