= Eat the Rich (Motörhead song) =

Single by Motörhead

from the album Rock 'n' Roll
- B-side: Cradle to the Grave / Just 'cos You Got the Power (12" only)
- Released: 2 November 1987
- Recorded: 1987
- Studio: Master Rock Studios; Redwood, London, UK
- Genre: Heavy metal
- Length: 4:36
- Label: GWR
- Songwriters: Phil Campbell; Würzel; Lemmy; Phil Taylor
- Producers: Motörhead; Guy Bidmead

Motörhead singles chronology
"Deaf Forever" (1986)	"Eat the Rich" (1987)	"Ace of Spades (live)" (1988)

Music video
- "Eat the Rich" on YouTube

"Eat the Rich" is a song by British heavy metal band Motörhead. It was released as a single in 1987, in 7" and 12" vinyl pressings. Both formats featured the B-side "Cradle to the Grave", and the 12" also included "Just 'Cos You Got the Power".

The title song was written for Peter Richardson's 1987 film Eat the Rich, starring the regular cast of The Comic Strip: the song also features on the Motörhead album Rock 'n' Roll

The Dutch single released by Roadrunner Records took the title track of the album as the A-side in place of "Eat the Rich", keeping "Cradle to the Grave" as the B-side. The sleeve used the artwork on the album cover, both sleeve designs were created by Joe Petagno.

== Track listing ==
All tracks written by Lemmy, Würzel, Phil Campbell, Phil Taylor

=== 7" ===
1. "Eat the Rich"
2. "Cradle to the Grave"

=== 12" ===
1. "Eat the Rich"
2. "Cradle to the Grave"
3. "Just 'cos You Got the Power"

== Personnel ==
Motörhead

- Lemmy – bass guitar, vocals
- Würzel – lead & rhythm guitars
- Phil "Wizzö" Campbell – lead & rhythm guitars, slide guitar on track 1
- Phil "Philthy Animal" Taylor – drums

Production

- Produced by – Motörhead and Guy Bidmead
- Originally recorded by Bill Laswell & Jason Corsaro, remixed by Guy Bidmead
