= Tear Ya Down: The Rarities =

Compilation album by Motörhead
- Released: 7 May 2002
- Recorded: 1977–1980
- Genre: Heavy metal
- Length: 1:22:02
- Label: Metal-Is/Sanctuary

Motörhead chronology
Hammered (2002)	Tear Ya Down: The Rarities (2002)	Hellraiser: Best of the Epic Years (2003)

Professional ratings
Review scores
Source	Rating
AllMusic	3.5/5 stars

Tear Ya Down: The Rarities is a 2-CD compilation album by the band Motörhead, released in 2002 on the Metal-Is label.

== Track listings ==
Disc 1
No.	Title	Writer(s)	Length
1.	"Hump on Your Back" (Demo)	Eddie Clarke	3:42
2.	"Shoot You in the Back" (Demo)	Clarke, Ian Kilmister, Phil Taylor	3:09
3.	"Dirty Love" (Demo 'Outtake')	Clarke, Kilmister, Taylor	1:02
4.	"Dirty Love" (Demo)	Clarke, Kilmister, Taylor	3:51
5.	"Love Me Like a Reptile" (Demo)	Clarke, Kilmister, Taylor	4:15
6.	"Fast and Loose" (Demo)	Clarke, Kilmister, Taylor	3:03
7.	"Waltz of the Vampire" (Demo Take on "Dance")	Clarke	3:38
8.	"Ace of Spades (Rare)" (Demo)	Clarke, Kilmister, Taylor	3:02
9.	"Bastard" (Rare Demo)	Clarke	3:04
10.	"Godzilla Akimbo" (Rare Demo)	Clarke	2:20
11.	"(We Are) The Road Crew" (Demo)	Clarke, Kilmister, Taylor	3:22

Disc 2
No.	Title	Writer(s)	Length
1.	"Like a Nightmare" (Alternative Version)	Clarke, Kilmister, Taylor	4:13
2.	"Treat Me Nice" (Rare Track)	Clarke	3:52
3.	"Stone Dead Forever" (Alternative Version)	Clarke, Kilmister, Taylor	4:35
4.	"Sharpshooter" (Alternative Version)	Clarke, Kilmister, Taylor	3:17
5.	"You Ain't Gonna Live Forever" (Rare Track)	Clarke	3:11
6.	"The Hammer" (Alternative Version)	Clarke, Kilmister, Taylor	3:12
7.	"Bomber" (Alternative Version)	Clarke, Kilmister, Taylor	3:36
8.	"Love Me Like a Reptile" (Alternative Version)	Clarke, Kilmister, Taylor	3:31
9.	"Fun on the Farm" (Rare Track)	Clarke	2:59
10.	"Tear Ya Down" (Alternative Version)	Clarke, Kilmister, Taylor	2:40
11.	"Fire, Fire" (Alternative Version)	Clarke, Kilmister, Taylor	2:41
12.	"Louie, Louie" (Alternative Version 2)	Richard Berry	2:45
13.	"Jailbait" (Alternative Version)	Clarke, Kilmister, Taylor	3:33
14.	"Step Down" (Alternative Version)	Clarke, Kilmister, Taylor	3:27

== Alternative Recordings ==
- The Richard-Berry-cover "Louie, Louie" was originally released by Motörhead on the single "Louie, Louie" in 1978.
- "Tear Ya Down" was originally released on the studio album Overkill in 1979.
- "Like a Nightmare" (or just "Nightmare" on Speed Not Comfort) was originally released on the single "No Class" in 1979.
- "Stone Dead Forever", "Sharpshooter", "Bomber" and "Step Down" were originally released on the studio album Bomber in 1980.
- "Dirty Love" was originally released on the single "Ace of Spades" in 1980.
- "Shoot You in the Back", "Love Me Like a Reptile", "Fast and Loose", "Ace of Spades", "(We Are) the Road Crew", "The Hammer", "Fire Fire" and "Jailbait" were originally released on the studio album Ace of Spades in 1980.

All three live versions were recorded at the Town Hall in Birmingham on 3 June 1977 and were originally released on the semi-official live album Blitzkrieg on Birmingham '77 in 1989. The tracks are also included in the 2002 released live compilation Keep Us on the Road – Live 1977, which contains both semi official-live albums Blitzkrieg on Birmingham '77 and Lock up Your Daughters.
