= Inferno (Motörhead album) =

Studio album by Motörhead
- Released: 22 June 2004
- Recorded: 2004
- Studio: NRG Studios, Paramount Recording Studios, Los Angeles and Maple Sound Studios, Santa Ana, California
- Genre: Heavy metal
- Length: 48:32
- Label: SPV/Steamhammer; Metal-Is/Sanctuary
- Producer: Cameron Webb

Motörhead chronology
Live at Brixton Academy (2003)	Inferno (2004)	BBC Live & In-Session (2005)

Inferno is the seventeenth studio album by British rock band Motörhead, released on 22 June 2004. It was their eighth with the Steamhammer label, and second under Sanctuary Records and its subsidiary Metal-Is in North America and certain territories.

== Recording ==
Inferno was Motörhead's first album with Cameron Webb producing. Webb told Joel McIver of Classic Rock Presents Motörhead in 2010 that he had wanted to make an album with the band for years and met them for dinner at the Sunset Marquis Hotel to discuss the possibility of working together: "I talked about how I wanted to make a really heavy record with them. That was a mistake, because Lemmy likes to play rock 'n' roll – he doesn't like to play heavy music – and he called me on it."

Nonetheless, the band and Webb produced Motorhead's heaviest album in years. In an interview for the bonus Inferno DVD, drummer Mikkey Dee states that Webb "pushed us a little more. He wasn't intimidated by our rock star moods". Lemmy adds, "That was a great thing, 'cause Mickey can be really intimidating and so can I, and Phil can be really violent." Not only was Webb able to find unity in the band in terms of recording but also understand Lemmy's bass sound, which had a lot more gain than low end. This was mostly attributed to Lemmy's hearing loss as he liked his songs to have a "brighter" sound and would always tell Webb to turn down the bass. This created an issue during recording and when Webb complained to manager Todd Singerman, he said, "dude, your ears are different. It's just the way it's gonna be. You're going to find a way to talk to [Lemmy] into doing things." Eventually, both Webb and Lemmy were able to resolve this matter; one of the ways was to turn on the subwoofer after Lemmy had left the studio.

The band explained that they made Inferno the same way as all their other albums – at the last minute – by renting a big rehearsal room in Los Angeles and writing songs for about six weeks and, after a week break, recording them while they're still fresh.

== Release ==
The album's closing song, "Whorehouse Blues", was somewhat of a departure. A country blues-style song, it was distinguished by acoustic guitar by all three members, with Lemmy adding harmonica towards the end. Dee explained his switch from drums: "I've been playing guitar all my life a little bit, because guitars have always been around, so it's nothing spectacular in my eyes." He added: "It's quite fun to walk onstage and do that song. And we definitely surprised the audiences."

Filming of the video for "Whorehouse Blues" was due to take place in a Stringfellow's club, but Peter Stringfellow objected to the song title and its associations, and withdrew any involvement. With 24 hours left until the shoot, they found a club in Ealing.

"In the Black" was featured in the 2009 video game Brütal Legend.

== Artwork ==
Joe Petagno, long-time sleeve artist for the band, said of the album cover:

"When I first decided to do the Inferno cover, I had the idea it should be Mars, the god of war. But I wanted to take the original three chrome heads I had created two years earlier and show it in the process of being formed at the foundry. Being poured, the molten metal, which goes through down the centre of the picture. It also formed the sword in the new logo. It's also an axis mundi, the centre of the world, which holds the whole Mars planet together. It's a circle, Mars is almost exploding. There are these soldiers coming in from the sides, which is very much like Iraq or any other hotspots in the world. At the same time as this Mars exploration shit was going on on TV... Great. Millions of people are dying, there's water on Mars, I'm so fucking happy. It came about because I was irritated about "Can't we just figure it out?... all the hypocrisy yet again, all the bloodshed, all the stupidity... it's in that cover. It was kind of a comeback to the Overkill and taking a second shot at it, really."

== Critical reception ==
Professional ratings
Review scores
Source	Rating
AllMusic	3/5 stars
Blabbermouth	7/10
The Encyclopedia of Popular Music	3/5 stars
Mojo	3/5 stars
Rock Hard	8.5/10
Rolling Stone	3/5 stars
Terrorizer	9/10

Guy Strachan praised Inferno in Terrorizer as "the best album that Motörhead have ever recorded". However, James Monger of AllMusic chided the band for "churning out the same record over and over again". "There are tinges of the blues here, of punk and of metal", wrote Ian Winwood for Mojo, "played by a band whose sharpness and precision is these days often overlooked."

In 2011, Motörhead biographer Joel McIver wrote: "Inferno was a blast from start to finish. Its bottom-heavy, modern sound suited the songs perfectly; it was almost as if, without realizing it, Motörhead had stamped their identity on the album more honestly than on any other album for at least a decade."

Lee Marlowe of Classic Rock stated in 2013 that "Killers" "is as catchy as anything in the band's vast catalogue: a strident stand-out on one of the strongest albums they've done", while "Whorehouse Blues" "makes perfect sense".

== Track listing ==
All tracks are written by Ian Fraser Kilmister, Phil Campbell, Mikkey Dee.

No.	Title	Length
1.	"Terminal Show"	3:45
2.	"Killers"	4:14
3.	"In the Name of Tragedy"	3:03
4.	"Suicide"	5:07
5.	"Life's a Bitch"	4:13
6.	"Down on Me"	4:12
7.	"In the Black"	4:31
8.	"Fight"	3:42
9.	"In the Year of the Wolf"	4:17
10.	"Keys to the Kingdom"	4:46
11.	"Smiling Like a Killer"	2:44
12.	"Whorehouse Blues"	3:53
Total length:		48:32

Bonus DVD (in certain territories)
No.	Title	Length
1.	"Interview & Making of Inferno"
2.	"Brave New World" (music video - from Hammered 2002)
3.	"Serial Killer" (music video - from Hammered 2002)
4.	"We Are Motörhead" (music video - from We Are Motörhead 2000)

== Personnel ==
Adapted from the album's liner notes.

- Lemmy – bass, vocals, acoustic rhythm guitar & harmonica on "Whorehouse Blues"
- Phil Campbell – guitars, acoustic lead guitar on "Whorehouse Blues"
- Mikkey Dee – drums, acoustic rhythm guitar on "Whorehouse Blues"

Guest musicians

- Steve Vai – lead guitar on "Terminal Show", guitar solo on "Down on Me"
- Curtis Mathewson – strings on "Keys to the Kingdom"

Production

- Cameron Webb – producer, mixing, engineer
- Bob Koszela – engineer
- Sergio Chavez – assistant engineer
- Chris Rakestraw – assistant engineer
- Kevin Bartley – mastering
- Steffan Chizari – creative design
- Mark Abramson – art direction, design
- Robert John – group photography
- Shawn Bathe – in-studio photography
- Lemmy – sketches, handwritten lyrics
- Joe Petagno – Snaggletooth, album cover

== Charts ==
Chart (2004)	Peak position
Austrian Albums (Ö3 Austria)	44
Belgian Albums (Ultratop Flanders)	74
Finnish Albums (Suomen virallinen lista)	17
French Albums (SNEP)	58
German Albums (Offizielle Top 100)	10
Scottish Albums (OCC)	84
Swedish Albums (Sverigetopplistan)	34
Swiss Albums (Schweizer Hitparade)	36
UK Albums (OCC)	95
UK Rock & Metal Albums (OCC)	7
