= Kings of the Road Tour =

2012–13 concert tour by Motörhead

- Tour by Motörhead
- Associated album: The Wörld Is Yours
- Start date: 5 November 2012
- End date: 2 August 2013
- Legs: 2 in Europe; 1 in North America; 3 total
- No. of shows: 30 in Europe; 3 in North America; 33 total, 10 cancelled

Motörhead concert chronology
- Mayhem Festival 2012; Kings of the Road Tour (2012–2013); Aftershock Tour (2014–2015)

The Kings of the Road Tour was a concert tour performed by the heavy metal band Motörhead in support of their album, The Wörld Is Yours.

== Background ==
During their show at the Wacken Open Air festival the band was forced to cut their setlist short due to frontman Lemmy Kilmister's health, playing only 6 songs in what was supposed to be a 75-minute setlist. Motörhead later posted on their Facebook page: "The show had to go on because that's how Lemmy rolls. Even though he was not 100% fit, he refused to feel he was letting the 85,000 Wacken fans down. They kicked ass in the 100-plus-degree heat for a shortened, but powerful, set before Lemmy finally realized he might have bitten off a little more than he could chew. Thus, he will embark upon the recuperation recommended. We know that rumors are flying around, but once he fully recharges, Motörhead will be back, don't you worry!" During their setlist at Download Festival, former Motorhead drummer Phil "Philthy Animal" Taylor came up on stage after the set.

== Setlists ==
=== Headliner setlist ===
1. "I Know How to Die"
2. "Damage Case"
3. "Stay Clean"
4. "Metropolis"
5. "Over the Top"
6. "Doctor Rock"
7. Guitar Solo
8. "Chase Is Better Than the Catch"
9. "Rock It"
10. "You Better Run"
11. "The One to Sing the Blues" (With drum solo)
12. "Going to Brazil"
13. "Killed by Death"
14. "Ace of Spades"

Encore:

15. "Are You Ready" (Thin Lizzy cover)
16. "Overkill"

=== Festival setlist ===
1. "I Know How to Die"
2. "Damage Case"
3. "Stay Clean"
4. "Metropolis"
5. "Over the Top"
6. Guitar Solo
7. "Chase Is Better Than the Catch"
8. "Rock It"
9. "The One to Sing the Blues" (With drum solo)
10. "Going to Brazil"
11. "Killed by Death"
12. "Ace of Spades"

Encore:

13. "Overkill"

== Tour dates ==
Date	City	Country	Venue	Support act(s)
Leg 1 — Europe
5 November 2012	Wolverhampton	England	Wolverhampton Civic Hall	Anthrax; Diaries of a Hero
6 November 2012	Manchester	England	O_{2} Apollo Manchester	Anthrax; Diaries of a Hero
8 November 2012	Newcastle	England	Newcastle City Hall	Anthrax; Diaries of a Hero
9 November 2012	Glasgow	Scotland	O_{2} Academy Glasgow	Anthrax; Diaries of a Hero
11 November 2012	Leicester	England	De Montfort Hall	Anthrax; Diaries of a Hero
12 November 2012	Cambridge	England	Cambridge Corn Exchange	Anthrax; Diaries of a Hero
14 November 2012	Portsmouth	England	Portsmouth Guildhall	Anthrax; Diaries of a Hero
15 November 2012	Bournemouth	England	Bournemouth International Centre	Anthrax; Diaries of a Hero
16 November 2012	Dublin	Ireland	The Academy	Anthrax; Diaries of a Hero
17 November 2012	London	England	O_{2} Academy Brixton	Anthrax; Diaries of a Hero
18 November 2012	Bristol	England	Colston Hall	Anthrax; Diaries of a Hero
20 November 2012	Deinze	Belgium	Brielpoort	Anthrax; Diaries of a Hero
21 November 2012	Paris	France	Zénith Paris	Anthrax; Diaries of a Hero
23 November 2012	Eindhoven	Netherlands	Klokgebouw	Anthrax; Diaries of a Hero
25 November 2012	Oberhausen	Germany	Turbinenhalle	Anthrax; Diaries of a Hero
26 November 2012	Offenbach	Germany	Stadthalle	Anthrax; Diaries of a Hero
28 November 2012	Ludwigsburg	Germany	Arena Ludwigsburg	Anthrax; Diaries of a Hero
30 November 2012	Erfurt	Germany	Thüringenhalle	Anthrax; Diaries of a Hero
1 December 2012	Munich	Germany	Zenith	Anthrax; Diaries of a Hero
4 December 2012	Hanover	Germany	AWD Hall	Anthrax; Diaries of a Hero
5 December 2012	Berlin	Germany	Columbiahalle	Anthrax; Diaries of a Hero
7 December 2012	Bern	Switzerland	Festhalle (Metal Christmas Festival)	—N/a
8 December 2012	Bamberg	Germany	Stechert Arena (Santa Rock Fest)	—N/a
10 December 2012	Ljubljana	Slovenia	Tivoli Hall	Niet
~~11 December 2012~~	Kempten	Germany	bigBOX Allgäu Hotel	—N/a
Leg 2 — North America
~~4 May 2013~~	Hammond	United States	Binion's Gambling Hall and Hotel	—N/a
14 May 2013	Los Angeles	United States	Club Nokia	Anvil
17 May 2013	Mexico City	Mexico	Palacio de los Deportes (Force Fest)	—N/a
19 May 2013	Guadalajara	Mexico	Explanada VFG (Hell & Heaven Metal Fest)	—N/a
Leg 3 — Europe
31 May 2013	Warsaw	Poland	Warsaw University of Life Sciences (Ursynalia – Warsaw Student Festival)	—N/a
1 June 2013	Nijmegen	Netherlands	Goffertpark (FortaRock Festival)	—N/a
5 June 2013	Nyon	Switzerland	Crans-près-Céligny (Caribana Festival)	—N/a
8 June 2013	Amnéville	France	Snowhall Parc (Sonisphere Festival)	—N/a
15 June 2013	Castle Donington	England	Donington Park (Download Festival)	—N/a
17 June 2013	London	England	IndigO2 (Metal Hammer Golden Gods Awards)	—N/a
~~22 June 2013~~	Unterpremstätten	Austria	Schwarzl Freizeit Zentrum (See-Rock Festival)	—N/a
~~25 June 2013~~	Milan	Italy	San Siro Racecourse	—N/a
~~28 June 2013~~	Löbnitz	Germany	Roitzschjora Airfield (With Full Force)	—N/a
~~4 July 2013~~	Gothenburg	Sweden	Göteborg Galopp (Metaltown Festival)	—N/a
~~23 July 2013~~	Valencia	Spain	The Real Gardens (The Real Gardens)	—N/a
~~26 July 2013~~	Moscow	Russia	Crocus City Hall	—N/a
~~28 July 2013~~	Kyiv	Ukraine	Palace of Sports	—N/a
2 August 2013	Wacken	Germany	Wacken Open Air	—N/a
~~4 August 2013~~	Lokeren	Belgium	Grote Kaai LokerseFeeslen	—N/a

== Personnel ==
- Lemmy Kilmister – bass guitar, lead vocals
- Phil Campbell – guitar
- Mikkey Dee – drums
