= 40th Anniversary Tour (Motörhead) =

2015 tour by Motörhead

- Tour by Motörhead
- Associated album: Bad Magic
- Start date: 19 August 2015
- End date: 11 December 2015
- Legs: 1 in North America; 1 in Europe; 2 total
- No. of shows: 18 in North America; 12 in Europe; 32 played, 25 cancelled

Motörhead concert chronology
- Aftershock Tour (2014–2015); 40th Anniversary Tour (2015); N/A

The Motörhead 40th Anniversary Tour was a concert tour performed by the English heavy metal band in celebration of their 40th anniversary, as well as in support of their 22nd and final studio album, Bad Magic. It would be the band's final tour before the death of Lemmy on 28 December 2015.

Lemmy's undisclosed health issues resulted in several concerts being cancelled. Nevertheless he continued to front Motörhead until his final concert just two weeks before his death in Los Angeles. After Lemmy's doctor had given him between two and six months to live, he had been meaning to make his diagnosis public in early 2016 but he died before a press release could be released.

== Background ==
=== Concerts ===
During the first leg of the tour, Motörhead had to curtail and cut several shows because of health issues. Beginning in Salt Lake City on 27 August 2015 (in the Rocky Mountains), Motörhead ended their performance early due to Lemmy's breathing problems (the result of an altitude sickness). They also had to cancel an appearance at Denver Riot Fest on 28 August 2015.

Their tour restarted on 1 September 2015 at Emo's in Austin, Texas (it was moved from the Cedar Park Center) but the band were again forced to abandon their set after three songs and cancel subsequent shows in Texas from the September 2015 to 5 September 2015. Despite these setbacks, Lemmy was able to return in time for the band's annual Motörboat heavy metal cruise from Miami to The Bahamas between the 28 September to 2 October 2015. Motörhead was joined by bands such as Slayer, Anthrax, Exodus, Suicidal Tendencies and Corrosion of Conformity.

The second leg of Motörhead's 40th Anniversary Tour began in Europe in November. The band played concerts in Germany, Sweden, Norway and Finland. However, their 15 November show at Zénith in Paris was postponed after the November 2015 Paris attacks. Two concerts on the 28th and 30 November in Germany were also postponed due to guitarist Phil Campbell suddenly requiring hospitalisation. These two shows were then moved back to 9 and 11 December; these would become the last ever concerts played by Motörhead. Speaking after Lemmy's death, drummer Mikkey Dee said: "He was terribly gaunt. He spent all his energy on stage and afterwards he was very, very tired. It's incredible that he could even play, that he could finish the Europe tour. It was only 20 days ago. Unbelievable."

== Opening acts ==
- Saxon (North America, Europe)
- Crobot (North America)
- Anthrax (North America)
- Girlschool (Europe)

== Setlist ==
1. "Bomber"
2. "Stay Clean"
3. "Metropolis"
4. "When the Sky Comes Looking for You" (added on November 17)
5. "Over the Top"
6. Phil Campbell guitar solo
7. "The Chase Is Better Than the Catch"
8. "Rock It"
9. "Lost Woman Blues"
10. "Orgasmatron" (added on November 17)
11. "Doctor Rock" with Mikkey Dee drum solo
12. "Just 'Cos You Got the Power"
13. "No Class"
14. "Ace of Spades"

Encore

15. "Whorehouse Blues" (added on November 17)
16. "Overkill"

Other performed songs included

- "Going to Brazil"
- "Damage Case"
- "We Are Motörhead"
- "Shoot You In The Back"
- "Rosalie" (Thin Lizzy cover)

== Tour dates ==
Date	City	Country	Venue
Leg 1 – North America
19 August 2015	Riverside	United States	Riverside Municipal Auditorium
21 August 2015	Las Vegas	United States	House of Blues
22 August 2015	Los Angeles	United States	Shrine Auditorium
24 August 2015	San Francisco	United States	Warfield Theatre
27 August 2015	Salt Lake City	United States	The Complex
~~28 August 2015~~	Denver	United States	National Western Complex (Riot Fest)
1 September 2015	Austin	United States	Emo's
~~2 September 2015~~	San Antonio	United States	Aztec Theatre
~~4 September 2015~~	Dallas	United States	The Bomb Factory
~~5 September 2015~~	Houston	United States	House of Blues
8 September 2015	St. Louis	United States	The Pageant
9 September 2015	Indianapolis	United States	Murat Theatre
11 September 2015	Chicago	United States	Douglass Park (Riot Fest)
12 September 2015	Detroit	United States	The Fillmore Detroit
15 September 2015	Wallingford	United States	Toyota Oakdale Theatre
16 September 2015	Wantagh	United States	Jones Beach Theater
18 September 2015	Montreal	Canada	L'Olympia
19 September 2015	Toronto	Canada	Downsview Park (Riot Fest)
22 September 2015	Upper Darby	United States	Tower Theater
23 September 2015	Charlotte	United States	The Fillmore
25 September 2015	Orlando	United States	House of Blues
26 September 2015	Pompano Beach	United States	Pompano Beach Amphitheater
Motörboat
30 September 2015	Norwegian Sky		
1 October 2015	Norwegian Sky		
Leg 2 – Europe
17 November 2015	Düsseldorf	Germany	Mitsubishi Electric Halle
18 November 2015	Saarbrücken	Germany	Saarlandhalle
20 November 2015	Munich	Germany	Zenith
21 November 2015	Munich	Germany	Zenith
24 November 2015	Frankfurt	Germany	Jahrhunderthalle
25 November 2015	Ludwigsburg	Germany	MHP Arena
~~26 November 2015~~	Berlin	Germany	Max-Schmeling-Halle
~~28 November 2015~~	Hamburg	Germany	Alsterdorfer Sporthalle
~~30 November 2015~~	Aarhus	Denmark	ACC
1 December 2015	Gothenburg	Sweden	Scandinavium
3 December 2015	Oslo	Norway	Oslo Spektrum
4 December 2015	Stockholm	Sweden	Hovet
6 December 2015	Helsinki	Finland	Hartwall Arena
9 December 2015	Hamburg	Germany	Alsterdorfer Sporthalle
11 December 2015	Berlin	Germany	Max-Schmeling-Halle
Leg 3 – Europe
~~23 January 2016~~	Newcastle	England	Newcastle City Hall
~~24 January 2016~~	Glasgow	Scotland	SEC Armadillo
~~26 January 2016~~	Manchester	England	O_{2} Apollo Manchester
~~27 January 2016~~	Swindon	England	Oasis Leisure Centre
~~29 January 2016~~	London	England	Eventim Apollo
~~30 January 2016~~	London	England	Eventim Apollo
~~1 February 2016~~	Lille	France	Zénith de Lille
~~2 February 2016~~	Paris	France	Zénith Paris
~~4 February 2016~~	Barcelona	Spain	Sant Jordi Club
~~6 February 2016~~	Madrid	Spain	Barclaycard Center
~~8 February 2016~~	Geneva	Switzerland	Geneva Arena
~~9 February 2016~~	Basel	Switzerland	St. Jakobshalle
~~11 February 2016~~	Milan	Italy	Alcatraz
~~14 February 2016~~	Vienna	Austria	Wiener Stadthalle
~~15 February 2016~~	Linz	Austria	TipsArena
~~17 February 2016~~	Bratislava	Slovakia	Aegon Arena
~~18 February 2016~~	Prague	Czech Republic	Forum Karlín
~~20 February 2016~~	Bolzano	Italy	Trento
~~22 February 2016~~	Chemnitz	Germany	Chemnitz Arena
~~23 February 2016~~	Offenbach am Main	Germany	Stadthalle Offenbach

== Personnel ==
- Lemmy Kilmister – bass guitar, lead vocals, harmonica on "Whorehouse Blues"
- Phil Campbell – guitar
- Mikkey Dee – drums, guitar on "Whorehouse Blues"
