= Aftershock Tour =

2014–15 concert tour by Motörhead

- Tour by Motörhead
- Associated album: Aftershock
- Start date: 11 April 2014
- End date: 26 July 2015
- Legs: 3 in Europe; 1 in North America; 1 in South America; 1 in Asia; 6 total
- No. of shows: 36 in Europe; 6 in North America; 4 in South America; 2 in Asia; 49 played, 28 cancelled

Motörhead concert chronology
- Kings of the Road Tour (2012–2013); Aftershock Tour (2014–2015); 40th Anniversary Tour (2015)

The Aftershock Tour was a concert tour performed by the heavy metal band Motörhead in support of their album, Aftershock.

== Background ==
Motörhead were due to embark on a European tour alongside Saxon, followed by a tour in Germany and Scandinavia due to last until mid December 2013 but the dates were postponed and rescheduled for February and March 2014 due to Lemmy's health problems.

However, in January 2014, Motörhead announced the cancellation of the new February and March dates of their European tour as Lemmy was still to reach full recovery from diabetes related health problems. At the Los Angeles show on April 11, both Slash and Lemmy's son Paul Inder appeared and played some songs. Slash would return again at bands show at Coachella Festival. At Birmingham former members Eddie Clarke and Phil Taylor appeared on stage with Eddie playing "Ace of Spades".

Later their show at Monsters of Rock at São Paulo was cancelled due to stomach problems suffered by Lemmy. Phil Campbell and Mikkey Dee were then joined by Sepultura's Andreas Kisser, Paulo Jr. and Derrick Green for a jam session.

== Setlist ==
First setlist (legs 1–2)

1. "Damage Case"
2. "Stay Clean"
3. "Metropolis"
4. "Over the Top"
5. Guitar Solo
6. "The Chase Is Better Than the Catch"
7. "Rock It"
8. "Lost Woman Blues"
9. "Doctor Rock" (with drum solo)
10. "Just 'Cos You Got the Power"
11. "Going to Brazil"
12. "Killed by Death"
13. "Ace of Spades"

Encore:

14. "Overkill"

Second setlist

1. "Shoot You in the Back"
2. "Damage Case"
3. "Stay Clean"
4. "Metropolis"
5. "Over the Top"
6. Guitar Solo
7. "The Chase Is Better Than the Catch"
8. "Rock It"
9. "Suicide"
10. "Do You Believe"
11. "Lost Woman Blues"
12. "Doctor Rock" (with drum solo)
13. "Just 'Cos You Got the Power"
14. "Going to Brazil"
15. "Ace of Spades"

Encore:

16. "Overkill"

Third setlist

1. "We Are Motörhead"
2. "Damage Case"
3. "Stay Clean"
4. "Metropolis"
5. "Over the Top"
6. Guitar Solo
7. "The Chase Is Better Than the Catch"
8. "Rock It"
9. "Lost Woman Blues"
10. "Doctor Rock" (with drum solo)
11. "Orgasmatron" or "Just 'Cos You Got the Power"
12. "Going to Brazil"
13. "Ace of Spades"

Encore:

14. "Overkill"

=== Other songs played ===
- "No Class"
- "Rosalie" (Bob Seger/Thin Lizzy cover)
- "'Heroes'" (David Bowie song) (Was attempted but was scrapped since Lemmy kept forgetting the lyrics)
- "I Know How to Die"

== Tour dates ==
Date	City	Country	Venue	Support Act(s)
~~Europe~~
~~13 February 2014~~	Glasgow	Scotland	O_{2} Academy Glasgow	Saxon; Skew Siskin
~~14 February 2014~~	Newcastle	England	Newcastle City Hall	Saxon; Skew Siskin
~~16 February 2014~~	Wolverhampton	England	Wolverhampton Civic Hall	Saxon; Skew Siskin
~~17 February 2014~~	Manchester	England	O_{2} Apollo Manchester	Saxon; Skew Siskin
~~19 February 2014~~	London	England	O_{2} Academy Brixton	Saxon; Skew Siskin
~~20 February 2014~~	Nottingham	England	Nottingham Royal Concert Hall	Saxon; Skew Siskin
~~22 February 2014~~	Paris	France	Zénith Paris	Saxon; Skew Siskin
~~24 February 2014~~	Deinze	Belgium	Brielpoort	Saxon; Skew Siskin
~~25 February 2014~~	Hamburg	Germany	Alsterdorfer Sporthalle	Saxon; Skew Siskin
~~27 February 2014~~	Munich	Germany	Zenith	Saxon; Skew Siskin
~~1 March 2014~~	Frankfurt	Germany	Jahrhunderthalle	Saxon; Skew Siskin
~~2 March 2014~~	Berlin	Germany	Velodrom	Saxon; Skew Siskin
~~4 March 2014~~	Düsseldorf	Germany	Mitsubishi Electric Halle	Saxon; Skew Siskin
~~5 March 2014~~	Stuttgart	Germany	Hanns-Martin-Schleyer-Halle	Saxon; Skew Siskin
~~8 March 2014~~	Linköping	Sweden	Cloetta Centre	Saxon; Skew Siskin
~~10 March 2014~~	Horsens	Denmark	Forum Horsens	Saxon; Skew Siskin
~~12 March 2014~~	Oslo	Norway	Sentrum Scene	Saxon; Skew Siskin
~~14 March 2014~~	Helsinki	Finland	Hartwell Arena	Saxon; Skew Siskin
Leg 1 – North America
11 April 2014	Los Angeles	United States	Club Nokia	Graveyard; Unlocking the Truth
13 April 2014	Indio	United States	Empire Polo Club (Coachella)	—N/a
15 April 2014	Chandler	United States	Wild Horse Pass Hotel & Casino	Ape Machine
17 April 2014	Las Vegas	United States	Pearl Concert Theater	Co-headlining with: Megadeth
18 April 2014	San Francisco	United States	Warfield Theatre	Graveyard
20 April 2014	Indio	United States	Empire Polo Club (Coachella)	—N/a
~~2 May 2014~~	Memphis	United States	Tom Lee Park (Beale Street Music Festival)	—N/a
~~3 May 2014~~	Concord	United States	Charlotte Motor Speedway (Carolina Rebellion)	—N/a
~~4 May 2014~~	Memphis	United States	Tom Lee Park (Beale Street Music Festival)	—N/a
~~10 May 2014~~	Banfor	United States	Darling's Waterfront Pavilion (Rise Above Fest)	—N/a
~~16 May 2014~~	Columbus	United States	Columbus Crew Stadium (Rock on the Range)	—N/a
~~18 May 2014~~	Columbus	United States	Columbus Crew Stadium (Rock on the Range)	—N/a
~~23 May 2014~~	Pryor Creek	United States	Pryor Festival Grounds (Rocklahoma)	—N/a
~~25 May 2014~~	Pryor Creek	United States	Pryor Festival Grounds (Rocklahoma)	—N/a
Leg 2 – Europe
24 June 2014	Milan	Italy	City Sound Hippodrome (City Sound Festival)	—N/a
27 June 2014	Wetzikon	Switzerland	Eishalle	Gloria Volt
4 July 2014	London	England	Hyde Park (British Summer Time)	—N/a
6 July 2014	Löbnitz	Germany	Flugplatz Roitzschjora (With Full Force)	—N/a
11 July 2014	Aix-les-Bains	France	Lac du Bourget (Musilac Music Festival)	—N/a
25 July 2014	Moscow	Russia	Crocus City Hall	—N/a
~~27 July 2014~~	Kyiv	Ukraine	Stereo Plaza	—N/a
27 July 2014	Minsk	Belarus	Palace of Sports	Litvintroll
1 August 2014	Wacken	Germany	Wacken Open Air	—N/a
3 August 2014	Lokeren	Belgium	Grote Kaai (Lokerse Feesten)	—N/a
7 August 2014	Gothenburg	Sweden	Slottsskogen (Way Out West Festival)	—N/a
10 August 2014	Colmar	France	Théâtre de Plein Air (Foire aux Vins d'Alsace)	—N/a
13 August 2014	Avenches	Switzerland	Arènes (Rock Oz'Arènes)	—N/a
Motörboat
22 September 2014	Carnival Ecstasy			—N/a
Leg 3 – Europe
4 November 2014	Manchester	England	O_{2} Apollo Manchester	The Damned; The BossHoss
6 November 2014	Birmingham	England	National Indoor Arena	The Damned; The BossHoss
8 November 2014	London	England	The SSE Arena, Wembley	The Damned; The BossHoss
10 November 2014	Munich	Germany	Zenith	The Damned; Skew Siskin
12 November 2014	Düsseldorf	Germany	Mitsubishi Electric Halle	The Damned; Skew Siskin
14 November 2014	Hamburg	Germany	Alsterdorfer Sporthalle	The Damned; Skew Siskin
16 November 2014	Berlin	Germany	Max-Schmeling-Halle	The Damned; Skew Siskin
18 November 2014	Paris	France	Zénith Paris	The Damned; Skew Siskin
20 November 2014	Zwolle	Netherlands	IJsselhallen	The Damned; Skew Siskin
Leg 4 – South America
~~25 April 2015~~	São Paulo	Brazil	Anhembi Convention Center (Monsters of Rock)	—N/a
28 April 2015	Curitiba	Brazil	Pedreira Paulo Leminski (Monsters of Rock)	—N/a
30 April 2015	Porto Alegre	Brazil	Esporte Clube São José (Monsters Tour)	—N/a
2 May 2015	Buenos Aires	Argentina	Ciudad del Rock (Monsters of Rock)	—N/a
5 May 2015	Santiago	Chile	Movistar Arena	Support act for: Judas Priest
Leg 5 – Europe
30 May 2015	Örebro	Sweden	Brickebackens IP (Metallsvenskan)	—N/a
5 June 2015	Nuremberg	Germany	Zeppelinfield (Rock im Park)	—N/a
7 June 2015	Mendig	Germany	Mendig Air Base (Rock am Ring)	—N/a
12 June 2015	Interlaken	Switzerland	Interlaken Airport (Greenfield Festival)	—N/a
14 June 2015	Nickelsdorf	Austria	Pannonia Fields II (Nova Rock Festival)	—N/a
19 June 2015	Clisson	France	Val de Moine (Hellfest)	—N/a
21 June 2015	Dessel	Belgium	Boeretang (Graspop Metal Meeting)	—N/a
23 June 2015	Esch-sur-Alzette	Luxembourg	Rockhal	—N/a
26 June 2015	Pilton	England	Worthy Farm (Glastonbury Festival)	—N/a
27 June 2015	St. Austell	England	Eden Project (Eden Sessions)	—N/a
3 July 2015	Sopron	Hungary	Lővér Kemping (Volt Fesztivál)	—N/a
4 July 2015	Plzeň	Czech Republic	Rock for People	—N/a
6 July 2015	Warsaw	Poland	Arena COS Torwar	Scream Maker
10 July 2015	Novi Sad	Serbia	Petrovaradin (Exit)	—N/a
17 July 2015	Viveiro	Spain	Campo de fútbol Celeiro (Resurrection Fest)	—N/a
Leg 6 – Asia
24 July 2015	Yuzawa	Japan	Naeba Ski Resort (Fuji Rock Festival)	—N/a
26 July 2015	Ansan	South Korea	Daebu Sea Breeze Theme Park (Ansan Valley Rock Festival)	—N/a

== Personnel ==
- Lemmy Kilmister – bass guitar, lead vocals
- Phil Campbell – guitar
- Mikkey Dee – drums
