= Hammered (Motörhead album) =

Studio album by Motörhead
- Released: 9 April 2002
- Recorded: 2001
- Studio: Henson, Hollywood; Chuck Reed's House
- Genre: Heavy metal
- Length: 45:46
- Label: SPV/Steamhammer (Europe); Metal-Is/Sanctuary (US)
- Producer: Thom Panunzio, Motörhead

Motörhead chronology
Over the Top: The Rarities (2000)	Hammered (2002)	Tear Ya Down: The Rarities (2002)

Hammered is the sixteenth studio album by British rock band Motörhead, released on 9 April 2002 via Steamhammer, their sixth with the label and beating the Bronze Records era total of original full-length album releases. It was also the beginning of distribution in North America, and other territories, under Sanctuary Records and their subsidiary Metal-Is.

== Recording ==
Hammered was released on Metal-Is, a rock label owned by the then-new Sanctuary Records. The album was recorded in the Hollywood Hills at Chuck Reed's house with Thom Panunzio producing. By this time, Motörhead had recorded several albums as a three-piece, with drummer Mikkey Dee, guitarist Phil Campbell, and original vocalist/bassist, Lemmy. In Joel McIver's memoir Overkill: The Untold Story of Motörhead, Dee is quoted as saying the album – which is noted for its darker subject matter and reflective tone – was influenced by the 9/11 attacks:

"We Are Motörhead, the album before, was extremely hard and fast, it was an extremely aggressive album, and this one's not so aggressive...Me and Phil, we flew into LA on September 10 and we wrote these songs over a month of fuckin' fear over there, you know, it was a bad vibe. So maybe that had something to do with the mood of this album. I was thinking about it afterwards. This album's actually really moody, you know? And the same goes for Lemmy, the way he wrote the melodies."

== Release ==
In the Motörhead documentary The Guts and the Glory, Lemmy states:

"Hammered...I'm kind of ambivalent, it's up and down. There's some good tracks on it and there's some crap on it."

The album is perhaps best remembered for "The Game", written by WWE music composer Jim Johnston as the entrance theme for wrestler Triple H. At two WrestleMania events, WrestleMania X-Seven and WrestleMania 21, Motörhead would perform this song live as Triple H made his entrance to the ring. Triple H also contributed co-vocals on the spoken word track "Serial Killer".

== Sleeve artwork ==
Joe Petagno, long time sleeve artist, had this insight into the concept of the album artwork:

"it was originally going to be used for the 27-year-old anniversary design, we took the 27 out and experimented. The first idea Lemmy had was to put two crossed hammers in at the bottom, but it looked too Russian. Then we opted for an ace in the end. It was supposed to be the gold braid you'd have on your military cap or shoulder. It's very pretty. The most difficult part was the lettering, the highlights and shadowing."

== Reception ==
Professional ratings
Review scores
Source	Rating
AllMusic	3/5 stars
The Encyclopedia of Popular Music	2/5 stars
Rock Hard	7.5/10

AllMusic review states:

"in Hammered's 'Walk a Crooked Mile', Motörhead has written at least one more classic to add to the band's large number of hits, which could easily fill a double CD. Epic in length and with a cool bassline courtesy of Motörhead[s] main dude Lemmy Kilmister, 'Walk a Crooked Mile' has a bit of a punk edge to it, like a lot of Motörhead's tunes, but it also closes with a stylish '80s-style metal guitar solo.."

Lee Marlow of Classic Rock wrote in November 2013 that:

"'Red Raw' deftly renewed that ageless, relentless, high-speed battery via a dash of brutish post-thrash modernity and lyrics that drip with moonlit murder and madness."

== Track listing ==
All tracks are written by Kilmister, Campbell, Dee except where noted.

No.	Title	Writer(s)	Length
1.	"Walk a Crooked Mile"		5:53
2.	"Down the Line"		4:23
3.	"Brave New World"		4:03
4.	"Voices from the War"		4:28
5.	"Mine All Mine"		4:12
6.	"Shut Your Mouth"		4:08
7.	"Kill the World"		3:39
8.	"Dr. Love"		3:49
9.	"No Remorse"		5:18
10.	"Red Raw"		4:04
11.	"Serial Killer"	Kilmister	1:45
Total length:			45:46

Bonus tracks
No.	Title	Writer(s)	Length
12.	"The Game"	Jim Johnston	3:30
13.	"Overnight Sensation" (Recorded live in Europe, 2000)		4:16

Limited edition bonus disk
No.	Title	Writer(s)	Length
1.	"Shoot You in the Back" (Live at Wacken Open Air 2001)	Kilmister, Eddie Clarke, Phil Taylor	2:52
2.	"R.A.M.O.N.E.S." (Live at Wacken Open Air 2001)	Kilmister, Campbell, Burston, Taylor	1:35
3.	"The Game"	Johnston	3:31

- Also includes a 16-minute MPEG on "25 & Alive Boneshaker", a preview of the (then) upcoming live album DVD of their 25th birthday concert in 2000, at the Brixton Academy in London.

== Personnel ==
Adapted from the album's liner notes.

- Lemmy – bass, vocals
- Phil Campbell – guitars
- Mikkey Dee – drums

Additional musicians

- Dizzy Reed – piano on "Mine all Mine"
- Triple H – vocals on "Serial Killer"
- Bob Kulick – guitars on "The Game"

Production

- Thom Panunzio – producer, engineer, mixing
- Chuck Reed – engineer, producer and mixing on "Serial Killer"
- Lemmy – producer on "Serial Killer"
- Bob Kulick, Bruce Bouillet – producers and mixing on "The Game"
- Bob Koszela – engineer
- Jim Danis – assistant engineer
- Jeff Rothschild – assistant engineer
- Bob Vosgien – mastering
- Joe Petagno – album cover design, Snaggletooth
- Steffan Chirazi – concept
- Mark Abramson/Zen Jam – design
- Gene Kirkland – photography

== Charts ==
Chart (2002)	Peak position
Finnish Albums (Suomen virallinen lista)	34
French Albums (SNEP)	113
German Albums (Offizielle Top 100)	39
Swedish Albums (Sverigetopplistan)	18
UK Rock & Metal Albums (OCC)	11
