= Protect the Innocent (Motörhead album) =

Box set by Motörhead
- Released: 25 August 1997
- Genre: Heavy metal; speed metal
- Label: Castle Communications

Motörhead chronology
Overnight Sensation (1996)	Protect the Innocent (1997)	Snake Bite Love (1998)

Professional ratings
Review scores
Source	Rating
AllMusic	3.0/5 stars
Collector's Guide to Heavy Metal	7/10
The Encyclopedia of Popular Music	3/5 stars

Protect the Innocent is a four-CD compilation album by British rock band Motörhead, released in August 1997.

== Track listing ==
Disc 1
No.	Title	Original Release	Length
1.	"On Parole"	1979 ~ On Parole	5:38
2.	"Leaving Here"	1979 ~ On Parole	2:54
3.	"White Line Fever (Stiff)"	1977 ~ "Leaving Here / White Line Fever"	2:43
4.	"Motörhead"	1977 ~ Motörhead	3:12
5.	"City Kids"	1977 ~ "Motörhead" (Single B-side)	3:25
6.	"Beer Drinkers and Hell Raisers"	1980 ~ Beer Drinkers and Hell Raisers	3:27
7.	"Louie Louie""	1978 ~ "Louie, Louie"	2:48
8.	"Tear Ya Down"	1979 ~ Overkill	2:42
9.	"Overkill"	1979 ~ Overkill	5:13
10.	"Too Late, Too Late"	1979 ~ "Overkill" (Single B-side)	3:27
11.	"No Class"	1979 ~ Overkill	2:41
12.	"Like a Nightmare"	1979 ~ "No Class"	4:28
13.	"Stay Clean"	1979 ~ Overkill	2:43
14.	"Metropolis"	1979 ~ Overkill	3:37
15.	"Bomber"	1979 ~ Bomber	3:43
16.	"Over the Top"	1979 ~ "Bomber" (Single B-side)	3:21
17.	"Dead Men Tell No Tales"	1979 ~ Bomber	3:08

Disc 2
No.	Title	Original Release	Length
1.	"Stone Dead Forever"	1979 ~ Bomber	4:55
2.	"All the Aces"	1979 ~ Bomber	3:25
3.	"Ace of Spades"	1980 ~ Ace of Spades	2:48
4.	"Dirty Love"	1980 ~ "Ace of Spades" (Single B-side)	2:56
5.	"Please Don't Touch"	1981 ~ St. Valentine's Day Massacre	2:50
6.	"Jailbait"	1980 ~ Ace of Spades	3:34
7.	"(We Are) The Road Crew"	1980 ~ Ace of Spades	3:12
8.	"The Chase Is Better Than the Catch"	1980 ~ Ace of Spades	4:18
9.	"Train Kept A-Rollin'" (Live in 1980)	1981 ~ No Sleep 'til Hammersmith (1996 Reissue)	2:45
10.	"Motörhead" (Live in 1981)	1981 ~ No Sleep 'til Hammersmith	4:47
11.	"The Hammer" (Live in 1981)	1981 ~ No Sleep 'til Hammersmith	3:05
12.	"Capricorn" (Live in 1981)	1981 ~ No Sleep 'til Hammersmith	4:41
13.	"Iron Horse / Born to Lose" (Live in 1980)	1981 ~ No Sleep 'til Hammersmith	3:58
14.	"Iron Fist"	1982 ~ Iron Fist	2:56
15.	"Remember Me, I'm Gone"	1982 ~ "Iron Fist" (Single B-side)	2:19
16.	"Heart of Stone"	1982 ~ Iron Fist	3:05
17.	"America"	1982 ~ Iron Fist	3:38

Disc 3
No.	Title	Original Release	Length
1.	"(Don't Let 'Em) Grind Ya Down"	1982 ~ Iron Fist	3:08
2.	"Stand by Your Man" (Feat. The Plasmatics)	1982 ~ Stand by Your Man	3:06
3.	"I Got Mine"	1983 ~ Another Perfect Day	5:24
4.	"Turn You Round Again"	1983 ~ I Got Mine	3:58
5.	"Tales of Glory"	1983 ~ Another Perfect Day	2:57
6.	"Shine"	1983 ~ Another Perfect Day	3:12
7.	"(I'm Your) Hoochie Coochie Man" (Live in 1983)	1983 ~ "Shine" (Single B-side)	6:32
8.	"Dancing on Your Grave"	1983 ~ Another Perfect Day	4:30
9.	"Another Perfect Day"	1983 ~ Another Perfect Day	5:30
10.	"Snaggletooth"	1984 ~ No Remorse	3:49
11.	"Under the Knife (Slow)"	1984 ~ "Killed by Death" (Single B-side)	3:51
12.	"Under the Knife (Fast)"	1984 ~ "Killed by Death" (Single B-side)	4:35
13.	"Deaf Forever"	1986 ~ Orgasmatron	4:28
14.	"On the Road" (Live in 1985)	1986 ~ "Deaf Forever" (Single B-side)	4:55
15.	"Steal Your Face" (Live in 1985)	1986 ~ "Deaf Forever" (Single B-side)	4:31
16.	"Orgasmatron"	1986 ~ Orgasmatron	5:24

Disc 4
No.	Title	Original Release	Length
1.	"Doctor Rock"	1986 ~ Orgasmatron	3:37
2.	"Rock 'N' Roll"	1987 ~ Rock 'N' Roll	3:50
3.	"Dogs"	1987 ~ Rock 'N' Roll	3:49
4.	"Eat the Rich"	1987 ~ Rock 'N' Roll	4:34
5.	"The Wolf"	1987 ~ Rock 'N' Roll	4:31
6.	"Cradle to the Grave"	1987 ~ "Eat the Rich" (Single B-side)	4:06
7.	"Just 'Cos You Got the Power" (Live in 1988)	1988 ~ Nö Sleep at All	7:36
8.	"Killed by Death" (Live in 1988)	1988 ~ Nö Sleep At All	5:59
9.	"Built for Speed" (Live in 1988)	1988 ~ Nö Sleep At All	4:54
10.	"Traitor" (Live in 1988)	1988 ~ Nö Sleep At All	2:50
11.	"The One to Sing the Blues"	1991 ~ 1916	3:08
12.	"Dead Man's Hand"	1990 ~ "The One to Sing the Blues" (Single B-side)	3:29
13.	"Eagle Rock"	1990 ~ "The One to Sing the Blues" (Single B-side)	3:08
14.	"Shut You Down"	1991 ~ 1916	2:40
15.	"I Ain't No Nice Guy"	1992 ~ March ör Die	4:14
16.	"You Better Run"	1992 ~ March ör Die	4:51
