= The Essential Motörhead =

Compilation album by Motörhead
- Released: 12 February 2007
- Genre: Heavy metal; speed metal
- Label: Metro Doubles

Motörhead chronology
Kiss of Death (2006)	The Essential Motörhead (2007)	Better Motörhead than Dead: Live at Hammersmith (2007)

Professional ratings
Review scores
Source	Rating
AllMusic	4.5/5 stars

The Essential Motörhead is a two-disc compilation album by the band Motörhead. It covers hits from the band's debut album Motörhead (1977) until the 10th album March ör Die (1992).

== Track listing ==
=== Disc 1 ===
No.	Title	Music	Original album	Length
1.	"Motörhead"	Lemmy Kilmister	1977 ~ Motörhead	3:11
2.	"White Line Fever (Stiff)"	Kilmister; Eddie Clarke; Phil Taylor	1977 ~ Leaving Here / White Line Fever	2:45
3.	"Iron Horse / Born to Lose"	Taylor; Mick Brown; Guy "Tramp" Lawrence	1977 ~ Motörhead	5:21
4.	"Louie, Louie" (Alternative Version)	Richard Berry	1979 ~ Overkill (1996 Reissue)	2:53
5.	"Overkill"	Kilmister; Clarke; Taylor	1979 ~ Overkill	5:13
6.	"Too Late, Too Late"	Kilmister; Clarke; Taylor	1979 ~ Overkill (Single)	3:24
7.	"Damage Case"	Kilmister; Clarke; Taylor; Mick Farren	1979 ~ Overkill	3:10
8.	"Tear Ya Down"	Kilmister; Clarke; Taylor	1979 ~ Overkill	2:41
9.	"Bomber"	Kilmister; Clarke; Taylor	1979 ~ Bomber	3:43
10.	"All the Aces"	Kilmister; Clarke; Taylor	1979 ~ Bomber	3:24
11.	"Stone Dead Forever"	Kilmister; Clarke; Taylor	1979 ~ Bomber	4:53
12.	"Ace of Spades"	Kilmister; Clarke; Taylor	1980 ~ Ace of Spades	2:48
13.	"(We Are) The Road Crew" (Alternative Version)	Kilmister; Clarke; Taylor	1980 ~ Ace of Spades (2005 Reissue)	3:25
14.	"The Chase Is Better Than the Catch"	Kilmister; Clarke; Taylor	1980 ~ Ace of Spades	4:17
15.	"Live to Win"	Kilmister; Clarke; Taylor	1980 ~ Ace of Spades	3:36
16.	"The Hammer" (Alternative Version)	Kilmister; Clarke; Taylor	1980 ~ Ace of Spades (2005 Reissue)	3:13
17.	"Please Don't Touch"	Johnny Kidd; Guy Robinson	1981 ~ St. Valentine's Day Massacre (EP)	2:50
18.	"Stay Clean"	Kilmister; Clarke; Taylor	1979 ~ Overkill	2:43
19.	"Metropolis"	Kilmister; Clarke; Taylor	1979 ~ Overkill	3:34
20.	"Capricorn"	Kilmister; Clarke; Taylor	1979 ~ Overkill	4:10
Total length:				67:14

=== Disc two ===
No.	Title	Music	Original album	Length
1.	"Speedfreak"	Kilmister; Clarke; Taylor	1982 ~ Iron Fist	3:27
2.	"Iron Fist"	Kilmister; Clarke; Taylor	1982 ~ Iron Fist	2:53
3.	"(Don't Need) Religion"	Kilmister; Clarke; Taylor	1982 ~ Iron Fist	2:42
4.	"Another Perfect Day"	Kilmister; Taylor; Brian Robertson	1983 ~ Another Perfect Day	5:29
5.	"Shine"	Kilmister; Taylor; Robertson	1983 ~ Another Perfect Day	3:10
6.	"Die You Bastard!"	Kilmister; Taylor; Robertson	1983 ~ Another Perfect Day	4:24
7.	"Killed by Death"	Kilmister; Michael Burston; Phil Campbell; Pete Gill	1984 ~ No Remorse	3:54
8.	"Deaf Forever"	Kilmister; Burston; Campbell; Gill	1986 ~ Orgasmatron	4:27
9.	"Orgasmatron"	Kilmister; Burston; Campbell; Gill	1986 ~ Orgasmatron	5:23
10.	"Doctor Rock"	Kilmister; Burston; Campbell; Gill	1986 ~ Orgasmatron	3:39
11.	"Ain't My Crime"	Kilmister; Burston; Campbell; Gill	1986 ~ Orgasmatron	3:44
12.	"Rock 'N' Roll"	Kilmister; Burston; Campbell; Taylor	1987 ~ Rock 'N' Roll	3:49
13.	"Dogs"	Kilmister; Burston; Campbell; Taylor	1987 ~ Rock 'N' Roll	3:50
14.	"R.A.M.O.N.E.S."	Kilmister; Burston; Campbell; Taylor	1991 ~ 1916	1:28
15.	"1916"	Kilmister	1991 ~ 1916	3:47
16.	"March ör Die"	Kilmister	1992 ~ March ör Die	5:41
17.	"I Ain't No Nice Guy" (Feat. Ozzy Osbourne & Slash)	Kilmister	1992 ~ March ör Die	4:18
18.	"Name in Vain"	Kilmister; Burston; Campbell	1992 ~ March ör Die	4:00
Total length:				66:05

== Motörhead ==
- Lemmy – lead vocals, bass
- "Fast" Eddie Clarke – guitars, backing vocals (disc one: tracks 1 – 20, disc two: tracks 1–3)
- Brian Robertson – guitars (disc two: tracks 4–6)
- Phil Campbell – guitars (disc two: tracks 7–18)
- Michael "Würzel" Burston – guitars (disc two: tracks 7–18)
- Phil "Philty Animal" Taylor – drums (disc one: track 1 – 20, disc two: tracks 1–6, 12–15 & 17)
- Pete Gill – drums (disc two: tracks 7–11)

=== Additional musician ===
- Tommy Aldridge – drums (disc 2: tracks 16 & 18)
