= Better Motörhead than Dead: Live at Hammersmith =

Live album by Motörhead
- Released: 16 July 2007
- Recorded: 16 June 2005
- Venue: Hammersmith Apollo, London
- Length: 1:42:48
- Label: SPV GmbH
- Producer: Cameron Webb, Motörhead

Motörhead chronology
The Essential Motörhead (2007)	Better Motörhead than Dead: Live at Hammersmith (2007)	Motörizer (2008)

Professional ratings
Review scores
Source	Rating
AllMusic	3.5/5 stars

Better Motörhead than Dead: Live at Hammersmith is the ninth live album by the band Motörhead, and is the entire concert of their 30th anniversary show at the Hammersmith Apollo in London on 16 June 2005. It was released on 16 July, 2007, on Steamhammer as a double CD, and is the third live album, tenth album in total, with the label.

== Recording ==
Motörhead have always stated that they are a touring band, which has kept them on their feet a lot more than record sales ever did; especially over the mid 1980s to the mid 1990s, when they had massive label issues, from 1984 to 1994 specifically. The lineup of Lemmy, Zoom and Mikkey (on this album) has been the most consistent one, since Würzel left the band. Mikkey Dee joined in 1992 during the end of making the March or Die album – 14 years prior to this album, and at this point equalling Phil "Philthy Animal" Taylor's time on the drums – whilst Phil "Zööm" Campbell joined in 1984, with Michael "Würzel" Burston, and never left the band.

When it comes to the Motörhead that most people since the early 1990s have seen live, this is it.

Some critics have used their forums, such as Allmusic and Blabbermouth, to point out that by this stage Motörhead seemed to be churning out live albums. But this can be expected from a band that has lived on the road, and finally got some respect.

The band seem to have been trying to make up for the many years of missing out on good, quality, live material put out to the public. Since their seminal No.#1 UK hit album, No Sleep 'til Hammersmith, was released they have struggled match it, as 1988s follow up album, Nö Sleep at All, was not nearly as good in record sales. It would be over a decade until the next live album, Everything Louder Than Everyone Else in 1999, recorded in 1998 in Germany, was released to the public, and it was quickly followed by Live at Brixton Academy in 2003, their 25th anniversary concert from 2000. So this album is putting out a statement that they have always wanted to do good by the fans, but haven't had the label to back them, until signing with Steamhammer.

== Release ==
"Love Me Like A Reptile", "Shoot You In The Back", "Over The Top" and "(We Are) The Road Crew", all off the Ace of Spades album, haven't been played live in more than a decade, let alone make the live album release, even if they found a place in some random setlist over the years. The album title song "Iron Fist", which once opened the set, gets a reprise. "I Got Mine" and "Dancing On Your Grave" haven't been played since the Brian "Robbo" Robertson days on their accompanying tour for Another Perfect Day back in the early eighties, and haven't seen the light of day until this recording.

"Dr Rock", also a set opener for years, gets a run from Orgasmatron, and the 'big hit' "Killed by Death", from the No Remorse compilation, both reflecting the Pete Gill days in the band. The once live twin solo jam track, "Just 'Cos You Got The Power" from the Eat The Rich single, hasn't been heard in a very long time and is a homage to late Würzel's days in the band. "Going to Brazil", also once a set opener (they have quite a few on this album) and "R.A.M.O.N.E.S.", from the last time Philthy had anything to do with band, both of the 1916 album.

The rest of the set has the regular show stoppers and plays some new track also, to round out a balanced list of songs over the band's career.

== Critical reception ==
It got a standard reception when it was released, as with the previous live album, which was also their 25th anniversary show, and also a double CD, with a similar amount of fanfare, that being not much.

AllMusic's Greg Prato writes:

"..the show marked a special anniversary for the group – thirty years since Motörhead first took the stage. Of course, the Lemster is the lone original 'head left in the band's ranks, but the trio continues to soldier on – a much needed gritty antidote to all the modern day rock fluff.."

Whilst Blabbermouths's Scott Alisoglu states:

"..here's a rarity, a MOTÖRHEAD live album! All kidding aside, one really cannot own too many MOTÖRHEAD live albums; it is just something that a band that seemingly gets stronger each year does, and fans love 'em for it. Besides, this show in front of 5,000 rabid fans at London's Hammersmith Odeon is in celebration of the storied trio's 30th anniversary. That in itself is cause for another live release.."

And Amazon said:

"..rekindles memories of a momentous night that even a cosmopolitan city like London doesn t see every day. Early June 2005 saw the long queue in front of the venerable Hammersmith Odeon, a venue of many legendary live shows, stretch right to the tube station on the other side of the road.."

== Track listing ==
CD 1
No.	Title	Writer(s)	Original album	Length
1.	"Doctor Rock"	Ian "Lemmy" Kilmister, Campbell, Burston; Pete Gill	1986 ~ Orgasmatron	5:12
2.	"Stay Clean"	Kilmister, "Fast" Eddie Clarke, Taylor	1979 ~ Overkill	2:47
3.	"Shoot You in the Back"	Kilmister, Clarke, Taylor	1980 ~ Ace of Spades	2:56
4.	"Love Me Like a Reptile"	Kilmister, Clarke, Taylor	1980 ~ Ace of Spades	4:04
5.	"Killers"	Kilmister, Campbell, Dee	2004 ~ Inferno	4:26
6.	"Metropolis"	Kilmister, Clarke, Taylor	1979 ~ Overkill	3:49
7.	"Love for Sale"	Kilmister, Campbell, Dee	1998 ~ Snake Bite Love	5:01
8.	"Over the Top"	Kilmister, Clarke, Taylor	1979 ~ Bomber (Single)	2:44
9.	"No Class"	Kilmister, Clarke, Taylor	1979 ~ Overkill	4:02
10.	"I Got Mine"	Kilmister, Robertson, Taylor	1983 ~ Another Perfect Day	5:13
11.	"In the Name of Tragedy"	Kilmister, Campbell, Dee	2004 ~ Inferno	4:01
12.	"Dancing on Your Grave"	Kilmister, Robertson, Taylor	1983 ~ Another Perfect Day	4:02

CD 2
No.	Title	Writer(s)	Original album	Length
1.	"R.A.M.O.N.E.S."	Kilmister, Campbell, Burston, Taylor	1991 ~ 1916	1:58
2.	"Sacrifice"	Kilmister, Campbell, Dee	1995 ~ Sacrifice	6:29
3.	"Just 'Cos You Got the Power"	Kilmister, Campbell, Burston, Taylor	1987 ~ Eat the Rich	6:32
4.	"(We Are) The Road Crew"	Kilmister, Clarke, Taylor	1980 ~ Ace of Spades	3:15
5.	"Going to Brazil"	Kilmister, Campbell, Burston, Taylor	1991 ~ 1916	2:19
6.	"Killed by Death"	Kilmister, Campbell, Burston, Gill	1984 ~ No Remorse	5:49
7.	"Iron Fist"	Kilmister, Clarke, Taylor	1982 ~ Iron Fist	6:10
8.	"Whorehouse Blues"	Kilmister, Campbell, Dee	2004 ~ Inferno	4:52
9.	"Bomber"	Kilmister, Clarke, Taylor	1979 ~ Bomber	3:33
10.	"Ace of Spades"	Kilmister, Clarke, Taylor	1980 ~ Ace of Spades	5:23
11.	"Overkill"	Kilmister, Clarke, Taylor	1979 ~ Overkill	9:42

== Personnel ==
Adapted from the liner notes.

=== Motörhead ===
- Lemmy – lead vocals, bass, harmonica and acoustic guitar on "Whorehouse Blues"
- Phil Campbell – lead guitar, acoustic guitar on "Whorehouse Blues"
- Mikkey Dee – drums, acoustic guitar on "Whorehouse Blues"

=== Production ===
- Cameron Webb – producer
- Motörhead – executive producers

== Charts ==
Chart (2007)	Peak position
French Albums (SNEP)	176
German Albums (Offizielle Top 100)	74
UK Rock & Metal Albums (OCC)	24
