= The Golden Years (EP) =

EP by Motörhead
- Released: April 1980
- Genre: Heavy metal
- Length: 14:34
- Label: Bronze
- Producer: Motörhead

Motörhead chronology
On Parole (1979)	The Golden Years (1980)	Ace of Spades (1980)

Professional ratings
Review scores
Source	Rating
AllMusic	3/5 stars

The Golden Years is the first live recording by English rock band Motörhead, released in April 1980 via Bronze Records. It reached number 8 on the UK charts at the time.

== Background ==
There was a distinct lack of radio play for the single; the radio stations claiming the vocals were too low in the mix – so after remixing the tapes a 7" single (new catalogue number of BRO92DJ) was issued to radio stations with just "Leaving Here" on the A-side and "Stone Dead Forever" on the B-side. It was recorded on their 1980 European tour, the same tour as the 1981 live album No Sleep 'til Hammersmith track "Iron Horse / Born to Lose", which is also unknown as to which venue any of these tracks were recorded. Despite the lack of radio exposure, on 1 May 1980 the band had managed to secure an appearance on the BBC TV's weekly chart show, Top of the Pops, to promote its upcoming release. Frontman Lemmy recalls in his autobiography, White Line Fever, that "the songs were pretty badly recorded, but the record got in the charts."

== Release ==
The original standard release of this EP was in 7" and 12" vinyl (Bronze Records), some lapses in quality control allowed through a number of copies of the 7" that play Kate Bush on the A-side. The German and Dutch releases were 7" 'juke box' press out centre singles and titled "Lochem POP '80" as an advertisement for their forthcoming appearance at Lochem Festival, Netherlands, on 15 May 1980.

Copies of the 12" version of the EP were bundled with the initial pressings of 12" version of the Shine single from the 1983 Another Perfect Day album.

"Leaving Here" and "Too Late, Too Late" were included on the September 1984 compilation album No Remorse, the last studio album released with Bronze Records after their contract had expired with the label; over a year after their previous studio album Another Perfect Day was released in June 1983.

It was part of the limited edition 10,000 boxed set compilation by Castle Records – Born to Lose, Live to Win: The Bronze Singles 1978-1983 – released in 1999 which included 10 CD's covering the singles released by Bronze over the years Motörhead were signed to them.

This EP is available as bonus tracks on the band's 1979 album, Bomber, reissued in 1996 by Castle Communications, and in 2005 by Sanctuary Records as part of their remastered deluxe edition 2-CD reissues.

== Critical reception ==
Eduardo Rivadavia of AllMusic states that The Golden Years "captures all the raucous energy and devastating power of the band's classic Lemmy, "Fast" Eddie Clarke, and Phil Taylor lineup at the peak of its power."

== Track listing ==
All tracks are written by Kilmister, Clarke, Taylor except where noted.

No.	Title	Writer(s)	Original release	Length
1.	"Leaving Here"	Brian Holland, Lamont Dozier, Edward Holland	1977 ~ Leaving Here / White Line Fever (single)	3:02
2.	"Stone Dead Forever"		1979 ~ Bomber	5:20
3.	"Dead Men Tell No Tales"		1979 ~ Bomber	2:54
4.	"Too Late, Too Late"		1979 ~ Overkill (single)	3:21

== Personnel ==
- Lemmy Kilmister – lead vocals, bass
- "Fast" Eddie Clarke – guitars, backing vocals
- Phil "Philthy Animal" Taylor – drums
