= Rock 'n' Roll (Motörhead album) =

Studio album by Motörhead
- Released: 17 August 1987
- Recorded: 1987
- Studios: Master Rock Studios and Redwood Studios (London)
- Genre: Heavy metal
- Length: 33:56
- Label: GWR
- Producers: Motörhead, Guy Bidmead

Motörhead chronology
Orgasmatron (1986)	Rock 'n' Roll (1987)	Nö Sleep at All (1988)

Singles from Rock 'n' Roll
- 1. "Eat the Rich" Released: November 1987; 2. "Rock 'n' Roll" Released: 1987 (NL)

Rock 'n' Roll is the eighth studio album by English rock band Motörhead, released in August 1987. It is their last album with the GWR label, as more legal issues embroiled the band with yet another label. Reaching only No. 34 in the UK Albums Chart, Rock 'n' Roll was, in that respect, the worst performing of all of Motörhead's top 40 chart hits.

It would see the return of 'classic line up' drummer Phil "Philthy Animal" Taylor, albeit only for a few more years before being fired.

== Background ==
In 1987, Motörhead appeared in the Peter Richardson film Eat the Rich, which starred the regular cast of The Comic Strip and Motörhead frontman Lemmy himself in a small part as "Spider". The band supplied six songs for the soundtrack as well. As the band was about to film their cameo, however, drummer Pete Gill was fired and Phil "Philthy Animal" Taylor rejoined after having quit in 1984. In his autobiography White Line Fever, Lemmy states the sacking of Gill was a long time coming:

"Peter was his own worst enemy, he was another one who wouldn't just be content in the band. He went up against me on a couple of decisions, and he was making Phil and Wurzel upset too. I got tired of him moaning, so when he kept us waiting while he hung around in the lobby of his hotel for twenty minutes while he read the paper or something, that was the proverbial last straw. I know it sounds trivial, but most flare-ups in families are, aren't they? And a band is a family."

Lemmy adds that he knew Taylor, who had been playing with Frankie Miller and ex-Thin Lizzy guitarist Brian "Robbo" Robertson, wanted to come back. Rock 'n' Roll would be the final album recorded by Motörhead on the GWR label and the last before Lemmy would relocate from the UK to Los Angeles.

== Recording ==
Rock 'n' Roll was produced by the band and Guy Bidmead at Master Rock Studios and Redwood Studios in London. In the Motörhead documentary The Guts and the Glory, guitarist Phil Campbell states, "I like it. It's not a great album but... there's things on there I like, a lot of good things I like."

Campbell adds that the studio manager informed them that the studio they were recording in was owned by Michael Palin, and Motörhead – who were all huge Monty Python fans – invited Palin to come down and do a recitation for the album. Palin showed up dressed in a 1940s cricketer outfit, with a V-necked sweater and his hair all brushed to one side. Lemmy remembers Palin walking in and saying, "Hello, what sort of thing are we going to do now, then?" and Lemmy answering "Well, you know in The Meaning of Life, there was this speech that began 'Oh Lord — .'" Palin replied "Ah! Give me some cathedral!" and went in and recorded the 'Oh Lord, look down upon these people from Motörhead' speech.

The song "Eat the Rich" was written specifically for the Richardson film and a music video was released as well (in addition to Lemmy, Koo Stark, Bill Wyman, and Paul McCartney also appear in the film).

In his 2002 memoir, Lemmy assesses the album:

"Anyhow, with Pete gone, we gave Phil Taylor his job back. It was a mistake in retrospect... things weren't the same, and I should have known they wouldn't be... Rock 'N' Roll is a fair album, but it isn't one of our best... Our biggest mistake was choosing Guy Bidmead to produce it. He was just an engineer, really, so we were pretty much producing ourselves... And (guitarist) Wurzel was having a bad time personally... In addition to all of this, we didn't have enough time to do the songs properly and when that happens you're pretty much wasting your time."

== Release ==
As with the previous two albums it was not a commercial success, even though Lemmy had appeared in a comedy film by the same name as the single, and the sound track to, "Eat The Rich". It continued the downwards momentum of the band into the late eighties, with no original release until 1991, when they made the 1916 album.

Lemmy also writes that Rock 'n' Roll has some great songs, like "Dogs", "Boogeyman", and "Traitor", which they played "for years", but overall it just did not seem to work. According to Joel McIver's 2011 Motörhead biography Overkill: The Untold Story of Motörhead, a court case between the band and GWR was sparked over the choice of a summer single in 1988; the band wanted to release a live performance of "Traitor" from Rock 'n' Roll that was recorded at the Giants of Rock festival in Hämeenlinna, Finland, while the label had wanted to put out a live rendition of the Motörhead classic "Ace of Spades".

== Artwork ==
Joe Petagno had other ideas for the cover of this album:

"I had this great idea and nobody wanted to listen to me. The original Rock 'N' Roll sleeve was supposed to be going up. I said, "Look, the tongue goes up. This thing is lifting off...it was supposed to be rocketing. So it was like a bomb. A projectile of some sort. When I finished it, they said, 'We can't have it going up, it doesn't make any sense'. So it's coming down. Couldn't convince them. This fucking band...(laughs)"

== Reception ==
Professional ratings
Review scores
Source	Rating
AllMusic	2/5 stars
Robert Christgau	A−
Collector's Guide to Heavy Metal	6/10
The Encyclopedia of Popular Music	3/5 stars
Record Mirror	3/5 stars
Spin Alternative Record Guide	3/10
Uncut	3/5 stars

While calling Motörhead "a rock & roll band in the purest sense", Eduardo Rivadavia of AllMusic concedes:

"The songwriting here is rather uninspired for the band's standards, and the one-two punch of the phenomenal title track and the amusing 'Eat the Rich' (the album's only true highlights) are over too soon."

In 2011, Motörhead biographer Joel McIver wrote:

"Put bluntly, it's far from Motörhead's finest work, although like all of their albums it has some scintillating high points – 'Dogs', 'Traitor' and 'Stone Deaf Forever' [sic] among them."

Robert Christgau stated:

"Though he's shed Bill Laswell's sonic entourage and rehired the lovable Philthy Animal Taylor to beat skins, Lemmy's brush with perfectionism seems to have transformed his recording philosophy. That layer of grunge is just gone, excised by the sharp vocal and percussive attack that made Orgasmatron the onslaught they'd promised for so long. Songwriting's still there, too, though 'Eat the Rich,' which ends up with Lemmy's rig on the menu, is the closest it comes to transmuting metal the way 'Deaf Forever' did. Guest divine: Michael Palin, who prays for trousers."

Rock 'n' Roll renewed commercial hope for Motörhead in the United States, with Lemmy moving to Los Angeles after the recording of this album permanently. The fans in the States appeared willing to see this band live and buy their albums whereas Britain is criticised as having lost interest in Motörhead.

In 2016, Classic Rock ranked Rock 'n' Roll as the worst Motörhead album ever made.

== Track listing ==
All tracks are written by Kilmister, Burston, Campbell, Taylor, except where noted.

Side A
No.	Title	Writer(s)	Length
1.	"Rock 'n' Roll"		3:49
2.	"Eat the Rich"		4:34
3.	"Blackheart"		4:03
4.	"Stone Deaf in the U.S.A."		3:40
5.	"Blessing" (spoken words by Michael Palin)	Michael Palin	1:00

Side B
No.	Title	Length
6.	"The Wolf"	3:28
7.	"Traitor"	3:17
8.	"Dogs"	3:48
9.	"All for You"	4:10
10.	"Boogeyman"	3:07
Total length:		33:56

Castle Communications 1996 reissue bonus tracks
No.	Title	Original release	Length
11.	"Cradle to the Grave"	1987 ~ Eat the Rich	4:12
12.	"Just 'Cos You Got the Power"	1987 ~ Eat the Rich	7:30

- The spoken word "Blessing" by Michael Palin is listed on some version as track 5 on side A (the original vinyl and cassette release). On the original CD version it had its own track selection slot (making it a 10-track CD). Otherwise it was at the end of track 4 ("Stone Deaf in the U.S.A.") as a hidden track or at the beginning of track 5 ("The Wolf"). On both of these last two versions it was uncredited on the cover.

=== Sanctuary Records 2006 2-CD deluxe edition ===
Disc one is the original album without bonus tracks. B1–B2 are from the B-side of the "Eat the Rich" 12-inch single. B3–B15 are live performances at the Monsters of Rock, Donington Park, England, on 16 August 1986, BBC Radio 1 broadcast on the Friday Rock Show.

Disc 2
No.	Title	Writer(s)	Original release	Length
1.	"Cradle to the Grave"	Kilmister, Burston, Campbell, Taylor	1987 ~ Eat the Rich
2.	"Just 'Cos You Got the Power"	Kilmister, Burston, Campbell, Taylor	1987 ~ Eat the Rich

BBC In-Concert, 1986
No.	Title	Writer(s)	Original Release	Length
3.	"Iron Fist"	Kilmister, Clarke, Taylor	1982 ~ Iron Fist
4.	"Stay Clean"	Kilmister, Clarke, Taylor	1979 ~ Overkill
5.	"Nothing Up My Sleeve"	Kilmister, Burston, Campbell, Pete Gill	1986 ~ Orgasmatron
6.	"Metropolis"	Kilmister, Clarke, Taylor	1979 ~ Overkill
7.	"Doctor Rock"	Kilmister, Burston, Campbell, Gill	1986 ~ Orgasmatron
8.	"Killed by Death"	Kilmister, Burston, Campbell, Gill	1984 ~ No Remorse
9.	"Ace of Spades"	Kilmister, Clarke, Taylor	1980 ~ Ace of Spades
10.	"Steal Your Face"	Kilmister, Burston, Campbell, Gill	1984 ~ No Remorse
11.	"Bite the Bullet"	Kilmister, Clarke, Taylor	1980 ~ Ace of Spades
12.	"Built for Speed"	Kilmister, Burston, Campbell, Gill	1986 ~ Orgasmatron
13.	"Orgasmatron"	Kilmister, Burston, Campbell, Gill	1986 ~ Orgasmatron
14.	"No Class"	Kilmister, Clarke, Taylor	1979 ~ Overkill
15.	"Motörhead"	Kilmister	1977 ~ Motörhead

- It would be the last time the song "Motörhead" would make it onto the release of a live recording. This compilation was released in 2006 but the show was recorded in 1986, and other than the original broadcast, had not been heard since. "Motörhead" has not been played live, with extremely few exceptions, since this era and the end of the 1980s.

== Personnel ==
Per the album's liner notes.

=== Motörhead ===
- Lemmy – bass, vocals, 3rd solo on "Boogeyman"
- Würzel – lead guitar, slide guitar on "Stone Deaf in the U.S.A."
- Phil "Wizzö" Campbell – rhythm guitar, slide guitar on "Eat the Rich"
- Phil "Philthy Animal" Taylor – drums
- Pete Gill – drums on Deluxe Edition Tracks 3 - 15
- Michael Palin - speech on "Blessing"

=== Production ===
- Guy Bidmead – production
- Roland Herrington – engineering
- Arabella Rodriguez – engineering
- Caroline Orme – engineering
- Phil Dane – engineering

"Eat the Rich" originally recorded by Bill Laswell

- Jason Corsaro – recording ("Eat the Rich")
- Guy Bidmead – remixing ("Eat the Rich")
- Andy Pearce – mastering (2006 remaster)
- Motörhead – executive producers
- Joe Petagno – Snaggletooth artwork
- John F. McGill – layout and design
- Curt Evans – 2006 cover design

=== 2006 deluxe edition remaster ===
- Steve Hammonds – release coordination
- Jon Richards – release coordination
- Malcolm Dome – sleeve notes
- Mick Stevenson – project consultant, photos and archive memorabilia

== Charts ==
Chart (1987)	Peak position
Australian Albums (Kent Music Report)	99
Dutch Albums (Album Top 100)	69
Finnish Albums (The Official Finnish Charts)	16
German Albums (Offizielle Top 100)	33
Swedish Albums (Sverigetopplistan)	41
UK Albums (Official Charts)	34
US Billboard 200	150
