= Protect the Innocent =

Protect the Innocent may refer to:

- Protect the Innocent (Motörhead album), a 1997 compilation album by Motörhead
- Protect the Innocent (Rachel Sweet album), a 1980 album by Rachel Sweet
