= Beer Drinkers and Hell Raisers =

EP by Motörhead
- Released: 14 November 1980
- Recorded: 27–29 April 1977
- Studio: Escape Studios, Kent, England
- Genre: Rock and roll; heavy metal
- Length: 14:47
- Label: Big Beat Records
- Producer: Speedy Keen

Motörhead chronology
Ace of Spades (1980)	Beer Drinkers and Hell Raisers (1980)	St. Valentine's Day Massacre (EP) (1981)

Alternative cover

Professional ratings
Review scores
Source	Rating
AllMusic	3/5 stars

Beer Drinkers and Hell Raisers (titled Motörhead on the original release) is an EP by the English band Motörhead, released in November 1980. The EP consists of four tracks recorded during sessions for their first album Motörhead, in 1977 at Escape Studios, Kent, England, but were previously unreleased. The EP was released by Big Beat Records, a subsidiary of Chiswick Records, who the band were signed to when the tracks were recorded in 1977. The release was not authorized by the band, though they did not oppose it. The EP entered the UK Singles Charts on 22 November, where it peaked at No. 43. peaking at No.1 on the UK Indie Chart.

== Background ==
All four tracks were recorded during the 1977 Motörhead album sessions and were regarded as outtakes. As such, they only saw a belated release after Ace of Spades peaked at No. 4 on the UK Albums Chart in 1980. Despite the band's success at that time, the EP failed to make any impact on the UK charts. A few years later, Chiswick label boss Ted Carroll would again raid his label archives to give a retrospective release of a live recording from the same era, called What's Words Worth?. Lemmy has stated about Ted Carroll's Chiswick Records back catalogue releases: "He's a great geezer and if it wasn't for Ted there wouldn't be any Motörhead anyway, so Ted has carte blanche, he can do what he wants with the old catalogue."

== Recording ==
The original ZZ Top version of "Beer Drinkers & Hell Raisers", recorded for their 1973 album Tres Hombres, features vocal lines traded between guitarist Billy Gibbons and bassist Dusty Hill, with the two alternating each line. Motörhead's version replicated this arrangement, with bassist Lemmy and guitarist "Fast" Eddie Clarke trading lines. This marked Clarke's debut as a lead vocalist, and was also one of the very few Motörhead songs which featured vocals from someone other than Lemmy, the others being "Step Down," "I'm Your Witchdoctor" and "Emergency".

An earlier version of "On Parole" had been recorded by the band in 1975 for an album for United Artists that was ultimately shelved, and ex-guitarist Larry Wallis released a version as a B-side to his 1977 Stiff Records single "Police Car". The song was a mainstay in Motörhead's early setlist, as exemplified on What's Words Worth?, though it was dropped permanently sometime after 1979 as the band's repertoire grew. "I'm Your Witchdoctor" ("a great song," Lemmy pronounces in his 2002 autobiography) is a John Mayall & the Bluesbreakers cover which was another mainstay of the band's setlist circa 1977–78. "Instro", the EP's only original composition, is a rare instrumental track from the band which is believed to have never been finished due to inadequate studio time during the 1977 sessions it was culled from.

== Release ==
The vinyl EP was issued as a 7" pressing (NS61) and as a 12" pressing (SWT61), both formats were pressed in black, blue, orange, pink and white vinyl and there was also a 7" 'Radio Play' Sleeve. Along with the Motörhead single's B-side, "City Kids," the tracks from this EP were included on the 1988 CD reissue of Motörhead by Big Beat Records. In 1982 Big Beat Records released German and French editions that added the extra tracks "Vibrator," "White Line Fever," "City Kids," "Keep Us on the Road," "Lost Johnny" and "Motörhead." It was released in the usual black vinyl (A 120 174) and as a picture disc (PD 120 174).

It has been bonus tracks on the original album Motörhead since Big Beat Records reissue added them in 1988, and subsequently by Chiswick and Ace Records in 2001 for its remastered release.

In his 2011 book Overkill: The Untold Story of Motörhead, biographer Joel McIver derides the EP's title, saying "This is an early example of many, many attempts by the various record companies who ruined, I mean handled, Motörhead's career to mould them into less sophisticated versions of themselves."

== Track listing ==
No.	Title	Writer(s)	Length
1.	"Beer Drinkers & Hell Raisers"	Billy Gibbons, Dusty Hill, Frank Beard	3:27
2.	"On Parole"	Larry Wallis	5:57
3.	"Instro"	Kilmister, Clarke, Taylor	2:27
4.	"I'm Your Witchdoctor"	John Mayall	2:58

== Track listing - 1982 Release ==
No.	Title	Writer(s)	Length
1.	"Beer Drinkers & Hell Raisers"	Billy Gibbons, Dusty Hill, Frank Beard	3:15
2.	"On Parole"	Larry Wallis	5:40
3.	"Vibrator"	Larry Wallis, Mick Brown	3:25
4.	"White Line Fever"	Motorhead	2:35
5.	"City Kids"	Duncan Sanderson, Larry Wallis	3:12
6.	"Instro"	Eddie Clarke, Ian Kilmister, Phil Taylor	2:20
7.	"I'm Your Witchdoctor"	John Mayall	2:45
8.	"Keep Us on the Road"	Motorhead, Michael Farren	5:35
9.	"Lost Johnny"	Ian Kilmister, Michael Farren	4:00
10.	"Motorhead"	Ian Kilmister	3:00

== Personnel ==
Per the Beer Drinkers and Hell Raisers liner notes.

- Lemmy Kilmister – lead vocals, bass
- "Fast" Eddie Clarke – guitar, backing vocals, co-lead vocals on "Beer Drinkers and Hell Raisers" and "I'm Your Witch Doctor"
- Phil "Philthy Animal" Taylor – drums

=== Production ===
- Speedy Keen – producer
- John Burns – engineer
- Adam Skeaping – mastering
- Motörhead – executive producers
