= Lucas Fox =

British drummer

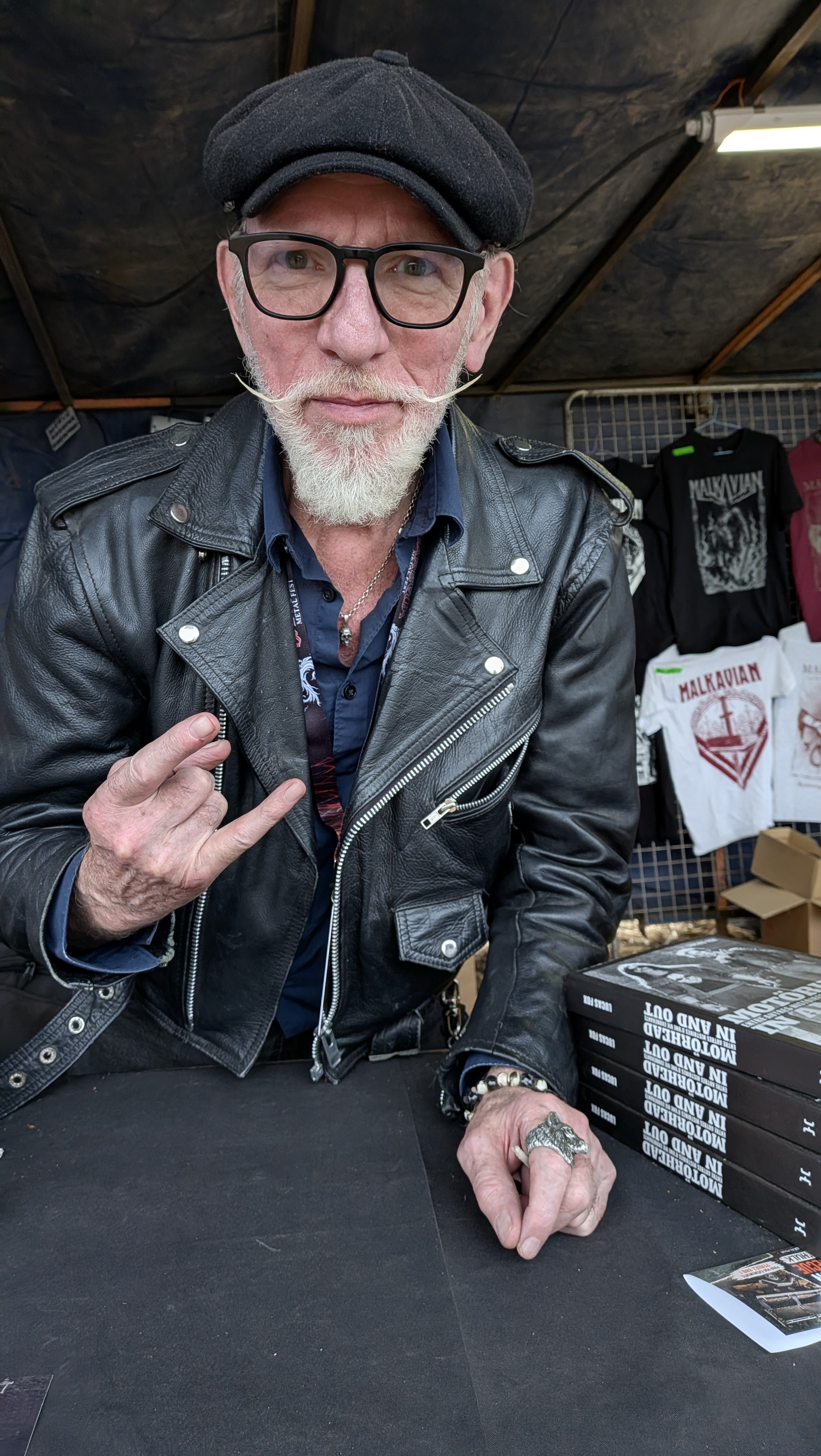
- Lucas Fox, signing session, Barbeuk Metal Fest IV (Champtoceaux, France), 2026

Background information
- Born: 25 February 1953 (age 73)
- Genre: Rock
- Occupation: Drummer
- Years active: 1973–present
- Member of: Pink Fairies
- Formerly of: Motörhead, Warsaw Pakt

Lucas Fox (born 25 February 1953) is an English drummer who was a founding member of the rock band Motörhead and the punk rock band Warsaw Pakt.

== Career ==
=== Motörhead ===
In 1975, Fox picked up Lemmy from London Airport after he was sacked from Hawkwind. Lemmy, Fox and Larry Wallis started a new band named Bastards, however the band's name was quickly changed to Motörhead following a suggestion by the band's manager Doug Smith. The band started by supporting Greenslade at the Roundhouse on 20 July performing cover versions except 'Motörhead' (Lemmy), 'On Parole' and 'City Kids' (Larry Wallis). Fox was the drummer for six months before being replaced during their first album at Rockfield Studios, Monmouth, Wales, recording sessions by Phil "Philthy Animal" Taylor. Fox's drumming appeared on the On Parole album track "Lost Johnny" which, unlike the rest of the songs Fox recorded for the album, were not overdubbed with Taylor's drums.

Fox also appeared in the band's 10th anniversary video in 1985, joining the band on stage for the final number, "Motorhead" at Hammersmith Odeon, London.

=== Warsaw Pakt ===
In Spring 1977, Warsaw Pakt was formed around Ladbroke Grove, London, composed of lead guitarist Andy Colquhoun of The Rockets, Fox on drums, vocalist Jimmy Coull, John Walker on rhythm guitar, and Chris Underhill on bass. The band gigged around local venues and played with Siouxsie and the Banshees at a gig in the bar of Exeter College, Oxford. Their debut album Needle Time was released through Island Records. 5,000 copies were sold in the first week, and at the end of the week Island Records decided they would not have any more pressed. The band continued to play locally for a few months more before finally splitting up in March 1978.

To avoid confusion with Warsaw Pakt, the band Joy Division changed their band name from the original, Warsaw.

=== Later career ===
After the break-up of Warsaw Pakt, Fox played for a brief time with the band Walking Wounded. In 1982 he was in the band The Spy's and they released one album that year, however the band soon split up. Fox was also one of the many drummers The Scientist employed between 1985 and 1986, of Civilisation Machine in 1985, and worked on Andrew Eldritch's side-project The Sisterhood.

In the late 1980s, Fox moved to France and became a technical director and programming director of the Midem festival, Cannes in 1986, 1987 and 1988, programming artists including James Brown, Al Jarreau, Kim Wilde and Véronique Sanson. This led to him heading an effort by the French Culture Ministry (Jack Lang) to promote French bands abroad with The French Revolution In New York in July 1989, French Invasion Of New York in July 1990, World Music Day (Los Angeles, San Francisco) and Bastille Day In The Park (Central Park, New York) in 1991 with 35, 000 spectators, France En Direct (London and Glasgow) in 1992 with Salif Keita amongst other artists. These events were responsible for the international success of bands such as the Gipsy Kings, Mory Kante, Cheb Khaled, Mano Negra, Les Satellites, Pigalle.

At the same time, Fox went on to produce many independent bands: Fixed Up, the Austrian gothic rock group A Wedding Anniversary, Ekatarina Velika, The Sisterhood, The Batmen, Paul Collins Beat, Les Musiciens Du Métro (compilation of 17 bands from the Parisian Metro), The Bowling Team's first album (co-produced with Troy Henriksen).

In 2018 he joined Paul Rudolph, original singer and guitarist of Pink Fairies and ex-Hawkwind bassist Alan Davey to record the album Resident Reptiles under the Pink Fairies name for Cleopatra Records.

In 2025, Lucas Fox published his autobiograhy in French and went on book signings and concerts tour in more than 40 cities in France.

== Discography ==
With WH Pierce Band

- WH Pierce Band – My Cow's A Gonna – 5 songs produced by Roger Walters & Nick Mason, Pink Floyd

With Ross Stagg

- Ross Stagg – I'll Never Be A Star, But I Might Pye Records

With Motörhead

- Motorhead – On Parole EMI (724385479427) 1997 Re-issue with 'The Dave Edmunds Produced' tracks of "On Parole", "City Kids", "Motorhead" and "Leaving Here" on which Fox drummed, as well as "Lost Johnny"
- Motorhead – The Birthday Party – Live Originally released as a VHS, and in 1991 as LP, cassette, and CD. It has also been released (in Brazil. 2003) as a DVD.

With Warsaw Pakt

- Warsaw Pakt – Needle Time Island Records (ILPS9515)

Carl Groszman's White Lightning

- Carl Groszman's White Lightning – Geraldine produced by Bruce Lynch, Ringo Records

With The Spy's

- The Spy's – Same Edel Records Gmbh then Line Records (LLP5145AP)

With Civilisation Machine

- Civilisation Machine – Into the Juice Closer Records – EP
- Civilisation Machine – Walk to the Sea Closer Records – Single

With The Sisterhood

- The Sisterhood – Gift Merciful Release (SIS020) LP
- The Sisterhood – Giving Ground Merciful Release (SIS010) Single

The Bowling Team

- The Bowling Team – Serious – Fiction Factory Mastering – Album

With Pink Fairies

- Pink Fairies – Resident Reptiles Purple Pyramid (CLO-0797) Album

== Bibliography ==
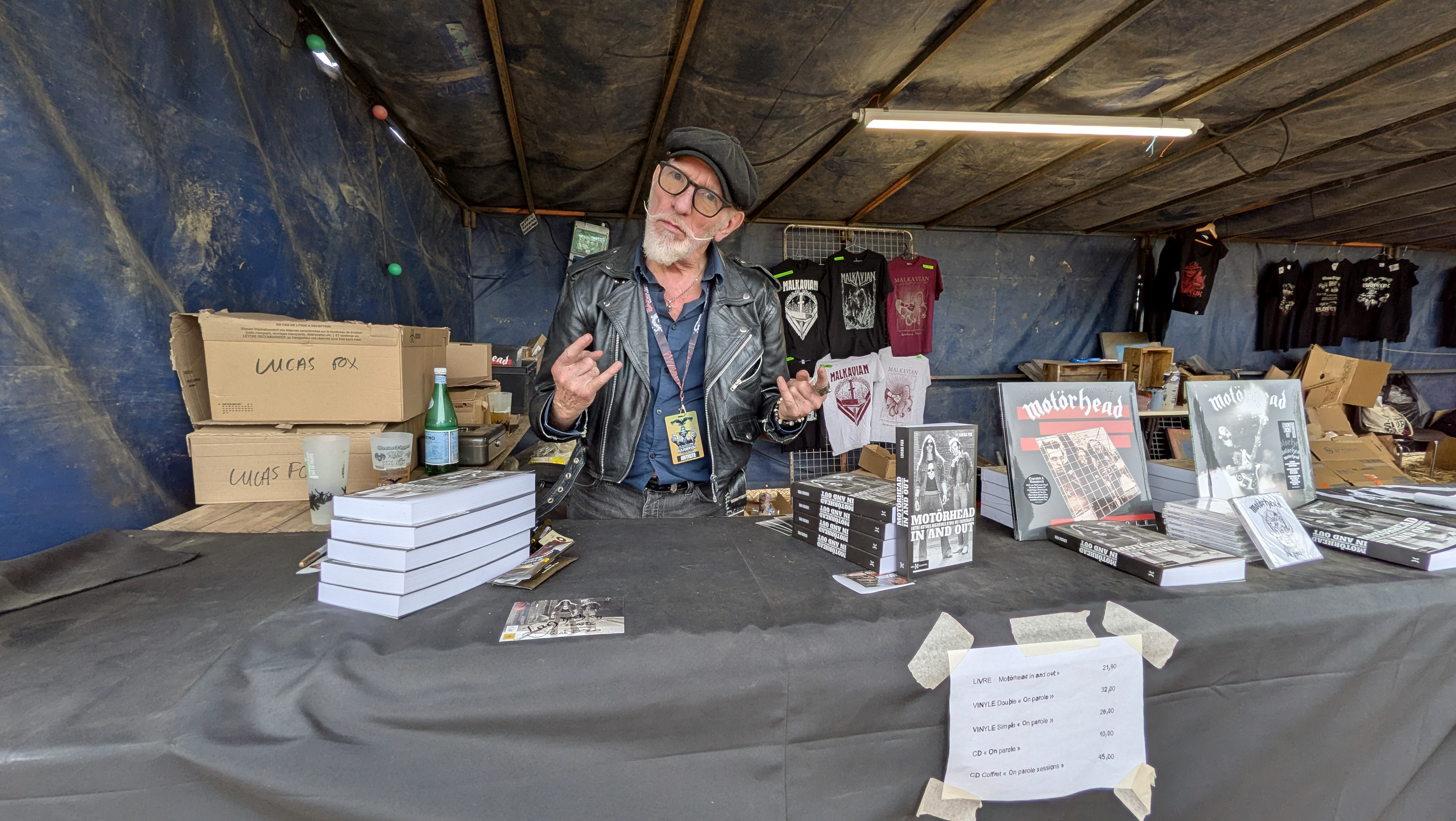
Signing session, Barbeuk Metal Fest IV (Champtoceaux, France), August 2026.

- In French: Motörhead in and out - Entre autres histoires d'une vie exubérante, Lucas Fox, Hors Collection editions (2025) ISBN 978-2701404530
- In Spanish: Motörhead In & Out: Historias de una vida exuberante, Lucas Fox, Libros Cúpula (2026) ISBN 978-8448045449
