= Bomber (album) =

Studio album by Motörhead
- Released: 12 October 1979
- Recorded: 7 July – 31 August 1979
- Studios: Roundhouse, London; Olympic, London
- Genres: Heavy metal; hard rock; speed metal
- Length: 36:48
- Label: Bronze
- Producer: Jimmy Miller

Motörhead chronology
Overkill (1979)	Bomber (1979)	On Parole (1979)

Singles from Bomber
- 1. "Bomber" Released: November 1979

Bomber is the third studio album by the English rock band Motörhead. It was released on 12 October 1979 by Bronze Records, their second with the label.

== Background ==
By 1979, Motörhead had been together for four years and had amassed a loyal following in both punk and heavy metal circles. After recording an album for United Artists that the label shelved, the band released its eponymous debut LP in 1977, but it was with 1979's Overkill that the band hit their stride. The title track landed in the UK Top 40 and, after appearing again on Top of the Pops, the band returned to the studio that summer with legendary producer Jimmy Miller to record what would become Bomber. However, the band did not have the opportunity to work up the songs on the road, as they had with their previous album. Joel McIver quotes singer and bassist Lemmy in his book Overkill: The Untold Story of Motörhead:

"I wish we'd played the songs onstage first, like we did with the Overkill album, if we could've played them for three weeks on the road it would have been less slick.....Listen to the way we play them live and compare that to the album."

Nonetheless, Bomber would peak at No. 12 on the UK albums chart, their strongest showing up to that point.

== Recording ==
During the recording of this album, Jimmy Miller was increasingly under the influence of heroin, at one point disappearing entirely from the studio and being found asleep at the wheel of his car. The album features the band's first anti-heroin song – "Dead Men Tell No Tales". Miller had produced some of the Rolling Stones most heralded work from 1968 to 1973 but, after struggling through the sessions for 1973's Goats Head Soup, had been shown the door. In the documentary The Guts and the Glory, drummer Phil "Philthy Animal" Taylor marvels:

"We used to think that we were bad at being late, but he would be, like, half a day late, or even more late, you know, and his excuses were marvellous."

In his autobiography White Line Fever Lemmy states:

"Overkill was supposed to be something of a comeback album for Jimmy Miller, which is exactly what it turned out to be for him. He had got very heavily into heroin (which likely began when he was working with the Stones) and he had lost it for a couple of years...but months later, when we were working with him on Bomber, it was sadly clear that he was back on smack."

The band returned to Roundhouse Recording Studios in London with additional recording taking place at Olympic Studios. This album caught Lemmy at his most ferocious, hitting hard at the police in "Lawman", marriage and how his father left him and his mother in "Poison", television in "Talking Head" and show business in "All the Aces". This album is the first to have a picture of the band on the cover, which features all three members inside a plane. The title track was inspired by Len Deighton's novel Bomber. On one track, "Step Down", Eddie Clarke is featured on vocals. In his memoir, Lemmy reveals that:

"[Clarke] had been bitching that I was getting all the limelight, but he wouldn't do anything about it. I got sick of him complaining, so I said, 'Right, you're gonna fucking sing one on this album'...he hated it, but really, he was a good singer, Eddie."

During the recording of Bomber, Motörhead played the Reading Festival, performing alongside other acts like the Police and The Tourists.

== Artwork ==
Adrian Chesterman illustrated the album cover, depicting Lemmy, 'Fast' Eddie Clarke and a bug-eyed Phil 'Philthy Animal' Taylor bearing down from the gunner cockpits of a Heinkel 111 bomber in the Blitz. Fascinated by military regalia, Lemmy insisted the plane be German because: "The bad guys make all the best shit".

Chesterman explains: "I suggested the Heinkel plane. They wanted this photo-realistic effect, so I designed the thing with the detached bomb coming towards you.

"I worked in airbrush in black and white, which I would then tint", he adds. "That's why my work always looked very doomy. To get the lighting right, I got a little Airfix kit of a Heinkel 111, made it up and sprayed it black". He then took photos to get the reflection underneath. Chesterman took the call on a Friday and met up with the band the next day.

"They wanted the artwork within a week, I suggested meeting them at midday. I don't think they were accustomed to getting up that early, because they all looked decidedly grumpy. Phil had a tin of Special Brew in his hand. The pictures of them in the plane were so small, I needed passport-sized photographs, which I cut out and painted in. I had to get them to snarl and look like they were shooting machine guns. Lemmy is curling his lip up. And Phil just had that expression permanently".

Despite Clarke being "a bit pissed off" at his "girly hair", Motörhead loved it. The effect was completed by a chrome Snaggletooth on the side of the plane. Such was the sleeve's impact that the band insisted on the now infamous Bomber lighting rig for their accompanying tour – a 40-foot (12 m) Heinkel replica that moved from side to side over the stage.

== Release ==
The single "Bomber" entered the UK singles charts on 1 December 1979, five weeks after the album; the single's initial pressing of 20,000 on blue vinyl was soon sold out and was replaced by black vinyl. The album was released on 12 October 1979 and like the single, was initially pressed on blue vinyl. The Bomber Tour followed, for which a 40-foot (12 m) aluminium-tube "bomber" was made; this had four "engines", whereas the plane depicted on the album sleeve (which bore a resemblance to the Heinkel He 111) had two. This lighting-rig could move backwards and forwards, and side-to-side – the first to be able to do so. The album cover features art by English commercial artist, Adrian Chesterman who was also responsible for creating cover art for, amongst others, Chris Rea for his 1989 The Road to Hell album.

In White Line Fever, Lemmy calls Bomber "a transitional record" but admits "there are a couple of really naff tracks on it, like 'Talking Head.'" In 1980 interview with Sounds, Clarke compared the LP unfavourably to Ace of Spades, stating "Bomber felt wrong. It wasn't all there".

== Critical reception ==
Professional ratings
Review scores
Source	Rating
AllMusic	4/5 stars
Collector's Guide to Heavy Metal	8/10
The Encyclopedia of Popular Music	3/5 stars
Rolling Stone	Positive
Spin Alternative Record Guide	6/10

One critic suggests that the album is well regarded by the fans, and packed full of essential Motörhead tracks, with "Dead Men Tell No Tales", "Stone Dead Forever" and the title track itself being "phenomenally good" metal songs, adding that, with the exception of the bluesy "Step Down", the tracks are full of the characteristic sound of the classic line-up of Lemmy, Clarke and Taylor, with Clarke's solo in "All the Aces" described as "blistering" and Lemmy spitting out intentions to "poison his wife" in the life-reflecting "Poison" making it a sound of metal-dripping brilliance.

Jason Birchmeier of AllMusic writes, "There are a couple killers here, namely "Dead Men Tell No Tales," "Stone Dead Forever," and "Bomber," but overall, the songs of Bomber aren't as strong as those of Overkill were. Granted, this is somewhat of a moot point to raise, as Bomber is still a top-shelf Motörhead album, one of their all-time best, without question."

Reviewer Kory Stone of Rolling Stone in a combined retrospective review of Overkill and this album calls it, in a positive light, the "slower, scuzzier sister" of the previous album while also stating that it "Showed that three musicians could play as heavy as any larger-sized band." And in another article in which it included 20 of the bands best songs, "Dead Men Tell No Tales" and the title track are two songs that made the list.

In 2011, Motörhead biographer Joel McIver wrote, "Some think that the effort of writing two killer albums in the space of a year was too much for Motörhead at this early stage, and that Bomber – released on 27 October, seven months after its predecessor – couldn't hope to match up to Overkill".

A special double CD reissue of the album was released in June 2005 to coincide with Motörhead's 30th anniversary tour. The bonus tracks on the second CD, however, have all previously been available. In 2005, Bomber was ranked number 397 in Rock Hard magazine's book of The 500 Greatest Rock & Metal Albums of All Time.

== Track listing ==
All tracks are written by Ian Fraser Kilmister, Eddie Clarke and Phil Taylor except where noted

Side A
No.	Title	Length
1.	"Dead Men Tell No Tales"	3:07
2.	"Lawman"	3:56
3.	"Sweet Revenge"	4:10
4.	"Sharpshooter"	3:19
5.	"Poison"	2:54

Side B
No.	Title	Length
6.	"Stone Dead Forever"	4:54
7.	"All the Aces"	3:24
8.	"Step Down"	3:41
9.	"Talking Head"	3:40
10.	"Bomber"	3:43
Total length:		36:48

Castle Communications 1996 CD reissue bonus tracks
No.	Title	Writer(s)	Original release	Length
11.	"Over the Top"		1979 ~ Bomber (single)	3:21
12.	"Leaving Here" (Live in 1980)	Lamont Dozier, Brian Holland, Edward Holland	1980 ~ The Golden Years	3:02
13.	"Stone Dead Forever" (Live in 1980)		1980 ~ The Golden Years	5:20
14.	"Dead Men Tell No Tales" (Live in 1980)		1980 ~ The Golden Years	2:54
15.	"Too Late, Too Late" (Live in 1980)		1980 ~ The Golden Years	3:21
Total length:				53:56

Disc one includes the original album without bonus tracks.

All tracks are written by Kilmister, Clarke, Taylor except where noted.

Disc 2 – Sanctuary Records 2005 2-CD deluxe edition
No.	Title	Writer(s)	Original release	Length
1.	"Over the Top"		1979 ~ Bomber (single)	3:20
2.	"Stone Dead Forever" (Alternative Version)		1997 ~ Stone Dead Forever	4:34
3.	"Sharpshooter" (Alternative Version)		1997 ~ Stone Dead Forever	3:16
4.	"Bomber" (Alternative Version)		1997 ~ Stone Dead Forever	3:35
5.	"Step Down" (Alternative Version)		1997 ~ Stone Dead Forever	3:29
6.	"Leaving Here" (Live in 1980)	Dozier, Holland, Holland	1980 ~ The Golden Years	3:02
7.	"Stone Dead Forever" (Live in 1980)		1980 ~ The Golden Years	5:31
8.	"Dead Men Tell No Tales" (Live in 1980)		1980 ~ The Golden Years	2:44
9.	"Too Late, Too Late" (Live in 1980)		1980 ~ The Golden Years	3:20
10.	"Step Down" (Live in 1980)		1992 ~ Jailbait (live bootleg)	3:49

== Personnel ==
Per the album's liner notes.

Motörhead

- Lemmy – bass, lead vocals
- "Fast" Eddie Clarke – guitars, backing vocals, lead vocals on all versions of "Step Down"
- Phil "Philthy Animal" Taylor – drums

Production

- Jimmy Miller – production
- Trevor Hallesy – engineering
- Darren Burn – mastering
- Nigel Brooke-Hartz – mastering
- Adrian Chesterman – design
- Joe Petagno – Snaggletooth (the Bomber has it painted on the side)

2005 deluxe edition remaster

- Nick Watson – mastering
- Steve Hammonds – release coordination
- Jon Richards – release coordination
- Sleeve Notes – Malcolm Dome – sleeve notes
- Mick Stevenson – project consultant, photos and archive memorabilia
- Curt Evans – cover design

== Charts ==
Chart (1979–80)	Peak position
UK Albums (Official Charts)	12

Chart (2019–21)	Peak position
Scottish Albums (Official Charts)	65
UK Independent Albums (Official Charts)	23
UK Rock & Metal Albums (Official Charts)	8

Chart (2025)	Peak position
German Albums (Offizielle Top 100)	97
Greek Albums (IFPI)	36

== Certifications ==
Region	Certification	Certified units/sales
United Kingdom (BPI)	Silver	60,000^{^}
^{^} Shipments figures based on certification alone.
