= Giants of Rock =

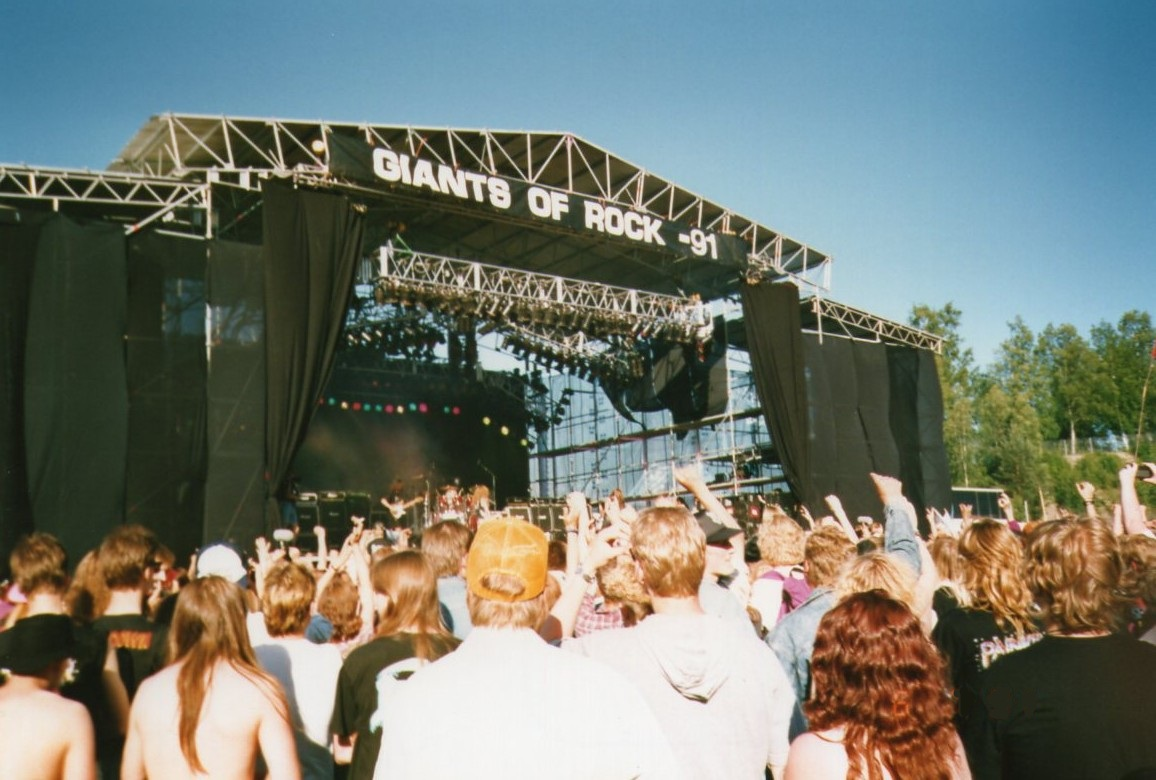
Giants of Rock 1991.

Giants of Rock was an annual hard rock and heavy metal festival in Hämeenlinna, Finland. It was held from 1987 to 1992 at Ahvenisto Race Circuit. The 1992 festival caused financial losses for organizers due to cancellations of some headlining acts. The last festival was arranged in 1994 as Power of Rock.

In 1988 Motörhead recorded their performance. It was later released as the band's second live album Nö Sleep at All.

== Main acts ==
15 August 1987

- Dio
- Helloween

2 July 1988

- Motörhead
- Girlschool
- Hurriganes

1 July 1989

- Anthrax
- Suicidal Tendencies
- D-A-D

28 July 1990

- Uriah Heep
- Sodom
- Running Wild
- Pretty Maids

6 July 1991

- Sepultura
- U.D.O.
- Winger
- Rage
- The Almighty

Power of Rock, 2 July 1994

- Accept
- Obituary

== Sources ==
- Tapio's Home Page/Concert Experiences
- motorheadoverkill.se
