= Meeting of Important People =

- Origin: Pittsburgh, Pennsylvania, U.S.
- Genres: indie rock; pop rock
- Years active: 2007–present
- Labels: Authentik; Wild Kindness
- Members: Josh Verbanets; Aaron Bubenheim; Matt Miller
- Website: www.facebook.com/meetingofimportantpeople

Meeting of Important People is an American indie pop/rock band based in Pittsburgh, Pennsylvania. The trio consists of guitarist/vocalist Josh Verbanets, bassist/vocalist Aaron Bubenheim, and drummer/vocalist Matt Miller.

== History ==
The group was formed in 2008 when members of three prominent Western Pennsylvania bands united. Verbanets formerly fronted a band whose 2006 debut album attracted major-label consideration, Miller previously worked with Lohio, and Bubenheim once was a part of local group Br'er Fox.

In July 2008, the group released its debut single "Mothers Pay More" on a promotional Key Party compilation album for the New American Music Union, a festival featuring Bob Dylan and the Raconteurs. In 2009, the group released its debut full-length, self-titled album on Authentik Music (later re-released nationally on vinyl by Get Hip Records). The group cites The Kinks, Loudon Wainwright, The Who, Nirvana, Jesus Christ Superstar, and Sia as some of their primary influences. Influential British radio station XFM put the band into rotation, which allowed the band to quickly gain an international image, while still serving mostly as an opening act for more known groups at home.

In September of that year, they shot a music video for the single "Brittney Lane Don't Care" with director Thom Glunt. The video featured a cardboard city, instruments and miniatures built by volunteers using recycled goods. The video was featured on Gizmodo for its extensive dedication to paper craft and brief popularity.

The band released a follow-up EP in July 2010 titled Quit Music, playing a sold-out release show at The Andy Warhol Museum.

In August 2012, they released their second full-length album, My Ears Are Having a Heart Attack, following a successful Kickstarter campaign.

The group released the single "All Rode Off Together" on label Wild Kindness Records in April 2015, and they released their third full-length album called Troika in February 2016. That summer, as part of a live performance event, the band filmed an episode of the WQED Sessions series. The episode featured the band performing their song "I Know Every Street in This Town" on top of a building in Downtown Pittsburgh. Shortly after this, guitarist Clark Slater began playing with the band for live shows. In addition, around this time, lead vocalist Verbanets also started a children's performing business with comedian Gab Bonesso called 'Josh and Gab.'

== Discography ==
=== Studio albums ===
Release date	Title	Label
March 2009	Meeting of Important People	Self-released
September 2009	Meeting of Important People	Re-release, Authentik Artists
2011	Meeting of Important People	Re-release on vinyl, Get Hip Records
2012	My Ears Are Having a Heart Attack	Authentik Artists
2016	Troika	Self-released

=== EPs ===
Release date	Title	Label
2010	Quit Music	Authentik Artists

=== Compilations ===
Release date	Title	Label
2008	Key Party Playing Favorites	Self-released

=== Singles ===
Release date	Title	Label
2015	"All Rode Off Together"	Wild Kindness Records
2019	"They Don't Know Where They Might Find Me"	Self-released

== Television credits ==
Show	Song used	Episode/Date
Ghost Whisperer	"I Know Every Street"	Season 5, Episode 2 "See No Evil"
Jane by Design	"I Can't Wait"	2012
