= Ten Black Years =

Compilation album by Sodom
- Released: 2 December 1996
- Genre: Thrash metal
- Length: 151:26; CD1: 74:04; CD2: 67:22
- Label: Steamhammer/SPV

Sodom chronology
Masquerade in Blood (1995)	Ten Black Years (1996)	'Til Death Do Us Unite (1997)

Ten Black Years – Best Of is a best-of compilation album by German thrash metal band Sodom. It was released on CD and cassette in 1996. In 2017, it was released on vinyl for the first time.

== Track listing ==
=== CD1 ===
No.	Title	Writer(s)	From the album	Length
1.	"Tired and Red"	Tom Angelripper, Frank "Blackfire" Gosdzik, Christian "Witchhunter" Dudek	Agent Orange	5:27
2.	"The Saw Is the Law"	Such, Michael Hoffman, Dudek	The Saw Is the Law (single)	5:50
3.	"Agent Orange"	Such, Gosdzik, Dudek	Agent Orange	6:04
4.	"Wachturm/Erwachet (Live)"	Such, Andy Brings, Dudek	Marooned Live (original versions from Tapping the Vein and Get What You Deserve)	4:07
5.	"Ausgebombt"	Such, Gosdzik, Dudek	Agent Orange	3:04
6.	"Sodomy and Lust (Live)"	Such, Gosdzik, Dudek	Mortal Way of Live (original version from the EP Expurse of Sodomy)	5:02
7.	"Remember the Fallen (Live)"	Such, Gosdzik, Dudek	Marooned Live (original version from Agent Orange)	4:07
8.	"Nuclear Winter"	Such, Gosdzik, Dudek	Persecution Mania	5:25
9.	"Outbreak of Evil"	Such, Josef "Grave Violator" Dominic, Dudek	In the Sign of Evil (EP)	4:45
10.	"Resurrection"	Such, Hoffman, Dudek	Better Off Dead	4:47
11.	"Bombenhagel (Live)"	Such, Gosdzik, Dudek	Mortal Way of Live (original version from Persecution Mania)	6:38
12.	"Masquerade in Blood"	Such, Dirk "Strahli" Strahlmeier, Guido "Atomic Steif" Richter	Masquerade in Blood	3:19
13.	"Bullet in the Head"	Such, Brings, Dudek	Tapping the Vein	3:01
14.	"Stalinhagel (Live)"	Such, Gosdzik, Hoffman, Dudek	previously unreleased on CD (taken from the VHS Live in der Zeche Carl) (medley of the songs "Stalinorgel" and "Bombenhagel") (original versions from Better Off Dead and Persecution Mania)	6:47
15.	"Shellshock (Live)"	Mark Brabbs, Peter James Brabbs	previously unreleased on CD (taken from the VHS Live in der Zeche Carl) (Tank cover) (featuring Peter "Peavy" Wagner on vocals and guitar)	2:15
16.	"Angel Dust"	Anthony "Antton" Lant, Jeffrey "Mantas" Dunn, Anthony "Abbadon" Bray	Get What You Deserve (Venom cover)	2:39

=== CD2 ===
No.	Title	Writer(s)	From the album	Length
1.	"Hunting Season"	Such, Brings, Dudek	Tapping the Vein	4:29
2.	"Abuse"	Such, Brings, Richter	Aber bitte mit Sahne (single)	1:44
3.	"1000 Days of Sodom"	Lant, Dunn, Bray	previously unreleased (Venom cover)	4:43
4.	"Gomorrah"	Such, Brings, Richter	Get What You Deserve	2:18
5.	"Unwanted Youth"	Such, Strahlmeier, Richter	Masquerade in Blood	3:34
6.	"Tarred and Feathered"	Such, Hoffman, Dudek	Better Off Dead	3:02
7.	"Iron Fist (Live)"	Ian Fraser "Lemmy" Kilmister, Edward Allan "Fast Eddie" Clarke, Philip John "Philthy Animal" Taylor	Mortal Way of Live (Motörhead cover)	2:57
8.	"Jabba the Hut"	Such, Brings, Richter	Get What You Deserve	2:32
9.	"Silence Is Consent"	Such, Brings, Richter	Get What You Deserve	2:30
10.	"Incest (Live)"	Such, Gosdzik, Dudek	Ausgebombt (single) (original version from Agent Orange)	4:27
11.	"Shellfire Defense"	Such, Hoffman, Dudek	Better Off Dead	4:22
12.	"Gone to Glory"	Such, Brings, Richter	Marooned Live (recorded during the soundcheck before the concert at the Docks in Hamburg in 1994)	1:59
13.	"Fracticide"	Such, Brings, Richter	Marooned Live (recorded during the soundcheck before the concert at the Docks in Hamburg in 1994)	2:50
14.	"Verrecke!"	Such, Strahlmeier, Richter	Masquerade in Blood	2:48
15.	"One Step over the Line"	Such, Brings, Dudek	Tapping the Vein	2:15
16.	"My Atonement"	Such, Gosdzik, Dudek	Expurse of Sodomy (EP)	6:03
17.	"Sodomized"	Such, Brings, Richter	Aber bitte mit Sahne (single)	2:38
18.	"Aber bitte mit Sahne"	Eckart Hachfeld, Wolfgang Spahr	Aber bitte mit Sahne (single) (Udo Jürgens cover)	3:01
19.	"Die stumme Ursel"	Such, Brings, Richter	Get What You Deserve	3:47
20.	"Mantelmann"	Such, Strahlmeier, Richter	Masquerade in Blood	2:10
