= Leaving Here =

1963 song by Holland–Dozier–Holland

Single by Eddie Holland
- B-side: "Brenda"
- Released: December 19, 1963
- Recorded: November 26, 1963
- Genre: Rock and roll
- Label: Motown 1052
- Songwriter: Holland–Dozier–Holland

Eddie Holland singles chronology
"I'm on the Outside Looking In" (1963)	"Leaving Here" (1963)	"Just Ain't Enough Love" (1964)

"Leaving Here" is a song written in 1963 by Motown songwriters Holland–Dozier–Holland. Written at the beginning of the partnership, it is notable in several recordings. It was originally released as a single in December 1963 by H-D-H lyricist Eddie Holland and peaked at number 76 on the Billboard Hot 100 and at number 27 on the Billboard R&B chart.

The original recording has subsequently been released on compilation albums such as Heaven Must Have Sent You: Holland/Dozier/Holland Story, released in 2005, and The Complete Motown Singles Vol.3 (1963), released in 2006. As of 2016, the only CD to find the track in stereo is A Collection of 16 Big Hits, Vol. 2 on Motown MOTD-5449.

== Motörhead version ==
"Leaving Here"

Single by Motörhead
- B-side: "White Line Fever"
- Released: 1977
- Recorded: Pebble Beach Studio, Worthing, England; 1977
- Genre: Hard rock
- Length: 3:20
- Label: Stiff
- Songwriter: Holland–Dozier–Holland

Motörhead singles chronology
"Leaving Here" (1977)	"Motorhead" (1977)

Alternative cover
- 1977 Blitz Records (Sweden) release

English hard rock band Motörhead released their version of "Leaving Here" as their debut single in 1977. Despite it being their first single, only the band's founder Lemmy remained from the band's original line-up. The recording was inspired by the Birds' 1965 cover version of Eddie Holland's "Leaving Here". Lemmy was a great fan of the band.

On April 28, 1979, Lemmy was interviewed by John Tobler on BBC Radio 1's Rock on Saturday show, and "Motorhead", "Leaving Here", and "Limb from Limb" were played.

=== Releases ===
Motörhead had originally recorded a version of this song for their debut album, On Parole, but unsure of its commercial viability their record company United Artists, to whom they were still under contract, refused to issue it. Jake Riviera of Stiff Records, a casual acquaintance of Lemmy's, offered to release a new single from the band. No official deals were made, and the band paid for the studio time whilst Riviera paid all other expenses. The single was scheduled for release with catalogue number BUY9 when United Artists intervened, forcing Stiff to shelve its distribution.

The single was issued in France (on Skydog Records, MH001, black on white sleeve) and Sweden (on Blitz Records, MH001, purple on white sleeve) with some copies being imported into the UK. The tracks were included on two 1977 Stiff compilation albums: A Bunch of Stiff Records (SEEZ2,1/April/1977) contained "White Line Fever", and Hits Greatest Stiffs (FIST1,16/September/1977) contained "Leavin' Here". The single did eventually see release as part of a box set of Stiff's first ten singles, limited to 5,000 copies, in 1979. Both tracks are currently available on the Stone Deaf Forever! CD box set.

A live version of "Leaving Here" was issued in 1980 as the lead track on The Golden Years EP, reaching No. 8 on the UK Singles Chart. "White Line Fever" was re-recorded for their 1977 debut album release, Motörhead.

=== Track listing ===
1. "Leaving Here" (Brian Holland, Lamont Dozier, Eddie Holland) – 3:20
2. "White Line Fever" [Stiff] (Eddie Clarke, Ian Kilmister, Phil Taylor) – 3:00

== Other cover versions ==
Motown blue-eyed soul singer Tommy Good released a version of the song as the B-side to his 1964 single "Baby I Miss You". The Messengers, a white group signed to Motown's Rare Earth label, recorded the track for their 1969 album The Messengers. The Isley Brothers also cut a version of the song while they were at Motown; it was only released, however, after they had left the label.

The Who recorded the song in the studio twice in 1965, and once for BBC Radio, but none of these recordings were released officially for decades; the 1985 compilation Who's Missing and the 1998 remaster of the Odds & Sods compilation album both included the song, though the latter states it is a previously unreleased version. An alternate take also appeared on the My Generation Deluxe Edition. The song is featured on The Who BBC Sessions CD. Additionally, it is available as downloadable content for the music video game series Rock Band as part of The Best of The Who pack.

In 1965, the Birds recorded a cover version of "Leaving Here" which inspired heavy metal band Motörhead to produce their debut single with a cover of the song twelve years later.

Swedish rock band Tages released a version as the B-side to their single "In My Dreams" in 1966, which reached number one in the Swedish charts. Both tracks appear on their second studio album, Tages 2. The song appeared as "Leavin' Here" on singles released by the Rationals in 1966 and 1967, as did a 1989 version by Tinsley Ellis on his debut album, Fanning the Flames.

In 1972 American rock band Brownsville Station covered the song on their second LP, A Night On The Town.

Pearl Jam recorded the song for the 1996 Home Alive compilation album which was released to fund women's self-defense classes. The song was later included on the band's 2003 Lost Dogs double album of B-sides and rarities. Pearl Jam has also covered the song numerous times at their live shows, and has released live recordings of the song as part of their bootleg series.

In 1997, American rock band, The Shambles, released a cover on a 7-inch Vinyl EP with Blow Up Magazine.

In 2001, Lars Frederiksen and the Bastards recorded the song for their debut album, Lars Frederiksen and the Bastards, one of two cover songs used on the album, the other songs all being original. The version is very similar to the Motörhead cover version. Ron Wood included a cover of the song on his 2001 album Not for Beginners.

This song often features in live sets by the Sadies, and Meeting of Important People frequently play it at live shows.

English psych/garage band the Bugs recorded a cover of the song on their debut EP single on the Hit Records label in 1987, produced by Dave Goodman.

The Irish rock band the Strypes recorded a cover of the song for their EP Young Gifted & Blue. Indiana-based rock band Heavy Mother also covered the song on their 2022 album This Time Around.

== Personnel ==
=== Eddie Holland Original version ===
- Lead vocals: Eddie Holland
- Backing vocals: the Love-Tones and the Andantes
- Instrumentation by the Funk Brothers

=== Motörhead version ===
- Lead vocals/Bass guitar: Lemmy Kilmister
- Guitar/Backing vocals: "Fast" Eddie Clarke
- Drums: Phil "Philthy Animal" Taylor
