= I Got Mine (Motörhead song) =

Single by Motörhead

from the album Another Perfect Day
- B-side: Turn You Round Again/Tales of Glory (12" only)
- Released: May 1983
- Recorded: 1983
- Genre: Heavy metal
- Length: 5:24
- Label: Bronze Records/EMI
- Songwriters: Brian Robertson; Ian Kilmister; Phil Taylor
- Producer: Tony Platt

Motörhead singles chronology
"Iron Fist" (1982)	"I Got Mine" (1983)	"Shine" (1983)

"I Got Mine" is a song by the British heavy metal band Motörhead. It was released in 1983 in 7" and 12" vinyl pressings with the B-side "Turn You Round Again", which appears on CD re-issues of the Another Perfect Day album. The 12" has the bonus album track "Tales of Glory". The single reached number 46 in the UK Singles Chart.

This single features guitarist Brian "Robbo" Robertson, who replaced "Fast" Eddie Clarke during their second U.S. tour.

== Track listing ==
All songs written by Ian Kilmister, Phil Taylor and Brian Robertson except where noted

=== 7" ===
1. "I Got Mine" (Brian Robertson, Ian Kilmister, Phil Taylor)
2. "Turn You Round Again"

=== 12" ===
1. "I Got Mine" (Robertson, Kilmister, Taylor)
2. "Turn You Round Again"
3. "Tales of Glory"

== Personnel ==
- Ian "Lemmy" Kilmister – bass, lead vocals
- Brian "Robbo" Robertson – guitar
- Phil "Philthy Animal" Taylor – drums
