= On Parole =

- United Artists 1979 release

Studio album by Motörhead
- Released: 2 November 1979
- Recorded: Sept. 1975 (4 songs) & Dec. 1975 (5 songs) January & February 1976 (overdubs)
- Studios: Rockfield (Rockfield, Wales)
- Genres: Rock and roll; hard rock
- Length: 36:59
- Label: United Artists
- Producers: Fritz Fryer, Dave Edmunds

Motörhead chronology
Bomber (1979)	On Parole (1979)	The Golden Years (EP) (1980)

1981 LP
- Liberty Records vinyl LP reissue. This cover is also used for the 2020 Expanded & Remastered reissue by Parlophone.

1991 CD
- Cleopatra Records First CD reissue. This CD cover has the original line-up of Lemmy, Larry Wallis and Lucas Fox.

1997 CD
- EMI CD remastered reissue with bonus tracks

On Parole is a studio recording released by the original line-up of English rock band Motörhead, which at the time consisted of Lemmy Kilmister on vocals and bass, Larry Wallis on guitar, and Phil "Philthy Animal" Taylor on drums (replacing Lucas Fox). It was intended as their first album and left unreleased at the time of its completion in 1976, and it was not released until over three years later, in November 1979, after the commercial success of Overkill and Bomber that same year. It was released without the band's permission, and they consequently distanced themselves from it. As a result, it was not considered an official release by the band at the time and they did not want it released, as they had moved on, since then, first to Chiswick Records and then to Bronze Records. The LP entered the UK charts on 8 December, where it peaked at No. 65.

With guitarist "Fast" Eddie Clarke replacing Larry Wallis in March 1976, most of On Parole's songs were re-recorded in April 1977, and formed the band's official first album, Motörhead, released the same year.

== Background ==
On Parole is the only album to feature the band's original line-up of Lemmy on vocals and bass, Larry Wallis on guitar and vocals, and Lucas Fox on drums. Motörhead signed a deal with United Artists when manager Douglas Smith secured a deal with the label's A&R man Andrew Lauder, both men having worked together for Lemmy's previous group Hawkwind. During the sessions, original producer Dave Edmunds relinquished his duties, being replaced by Fritz Fryer. Fox left the band as recording was nearing its conclusion and was replaced by Phil "Philthy Animal" Taylor, a casual acquaintance Lemmy had met through the local "speed" scene. Taylor had been persuaded to drive him to Rockfield Studios and "bring his drum kit", as he had boasted to Lemmy that he was a drummer. Taylor was given the job and set about overdubbing all of Fox's previously recorded drum tracks with the exception of "Lost Johnny" (which was co-written with Mick Farren), as he was being held in jail following an arrest for alleged drunk-and-disorderly conduct when that session was due to take place.

Taylor had taken a job painting a houseboat and his foreman happened to be "Fast" Eddie Clarke. When Taylor mentioned that he had just joined Motörhead, Clarke was intrigued, having read about the band. Clarke told Taylor that he was a guitarist but didn't mention that he had recorded two albums with Curtis Knight. When Motörhead guitarist Wallis floated the idea of adding a second guitarist to the band, Taylor recommended Clarke, and the band briefly became a four-piece for the first time. Wallis' interest in the band was rapidly fading and he soon left, and Motörhead were a trio once more.

== Recording ==
Four of the songs appearing on On Parole were recorded during a single session at Rockfield Studios in Monmouth, Wales in September 1975, while the rest were recorded in December 1975, with various overdubs laid down in January and February 1976. Initially, the band recorded several demos with producer Dave Edmunds at Rockfield, but Edmunds' commitment to the project was questionable. Lemmy later told Geoff Barton of Sounds:

Dave Edmonds and us got on OK, it was just that at the time he was negotiating a record deal or something for himself and was kind of preoccupied. These people kept arriving in big cars to talk to him – most of the time his mind seemed somewhere else.

The fatigue of recording with an uncommitted producer also had a deleterious effect on Larry Wallis (who left the band soon afterwards):

The problems eventually took over the fun. Recording the first album, On Parole, was trying enough on its own. We had to get down to Wales to record at Rockfield. Lem turned up a day or two late and then Dave Edmonds bowed out of producing it at the last minute. Then we took Lucas' drum tracks off and replaced them with Phil's (Taylor). Then UA made Lemmy record the bass tracks again. And after all that, they refused to put it out! The game didn't look as if it was worth the candle. I wanted another guitarist to flesh it out, but once Eddie Clark [sic] came along, it was apparent he would be the man to replace me.

Of the tracks, three ("Motörhead", "The Watcher" and "Lost Johnny") were re-recordings of songs Lemmy had written and recorded with Hawkwind (the latter co-written with Mick Farren), "City Kids" was a re-recording of a Wallis-penned track previously recorded by The Pink Fairies, and "Leaving Here" was a cover version of a Holland-Dozier-Holland Motown song Lemmy had learned whilst a roadie for The Birds. Perhaps concluding that the Motörhead version would never see the light of day, Wallis re-recorded and released the track "On Parole" as a B-side to his Stiff Records "Police Car" single in 1977 with two members of Eddie and the Hot Rods (bassist Paul Gray and drummer Steve Nicol).

In his autobiography White Line Fever, Lemmy mentions being blown away by Taylor's ability to overdub drums during the On Parole sessions, noting that it was "quite a feat, because the drums are what you usually base a song on – it's kind of like going ass-backwards". Conversely, Lemmy also recalled the moment he realized Taylor was not a singer, noting that "he sounded like two cats being stapled together" while trying to sing "City Kids".

The lyrics to "Vibrator" and "Fools" were written by Derek "Dez" Brown, a road-crew member from Wallis' pre-Motörhead band The Pink Fairies. Brown would manage the Live Stiffs tour in 1977, which included Nick Lowe's band on the bill featuring both Wallis and Edmunds.

== Release ==
Upon hearing the finished recordings, United Artists were not convinced of the album's commercial potential and shelved its release. Lemmy recalled his frustrations dealing with the label:

'What the fuck's happening? When's the album coming out? When are you gonna get us some gigs? What's happening about getting us an agency?' All we'd get was bullshit about the sleeve, you know, photographs and all that. When we got back from Rockfield with the masters, of course, we got the big: 'Oh, great, fantastic', but in the ensuing weeks it was just excuses and bullshit.

After the band's profile had risen with the commercial success of the albums Overkill and Bomber in 1979, United Artists re-appraised the album and gave it a belated release at the end of that year. In his book Overkill: The Untold Story of Motorhead, biographer Joel McIver quotes Lemmy:

United Artists were a bunch of twats in the final analysis. Yeah, they cashed in on us. We had the Bomber album out and were already big. But I don't care about these people. Record companies are a hindrance to rock 'n' roll, not a help. They dilute the real thing down to the lowest common denominator.

However, already in 1981 Lemmy acknowledged the album's legitimate place in the Motörhead canon, in the liner notes to the Liberty Records release:

What you are holding in your hot, sticky, avaricious little hands is the first evidence of anything called Motörhead. [...] Most of the songs were done better on the "MOTÖRHEAD" album. However, it is part of the story. So there.

== Critical reception ==
Professional ratings
Review scores
Source	Rating
AllMusic	3/5 stars
Collector's Guide to Heavy Metal	6/10
The Encyclopedia of Popular Music	3/5 stars
Spin Alternative Record Guide	4/10

Dave Thompson of AllMusic calls the arrangements on the LP "devastating, steeped in blues, drenched in booze, the highest octane pub rock of all. No matter how well you think you know Motörhead, still it's nothing like you're expecting. A true sonic symphony, this is Wagner with whiplash."

== Track listing ==
Side one
No.	Title	Writer(s)	Length
1.	"Motörhead"	Ian Kilmister	2:57
2.	"On Parole"	Larry Wallis	5:38
3.	"Vibrator"	Wallis, Des Brown	2:53
4.	"Iron Horse/Born to Lose"	Phil Taylor, Mick Brown, Guy "Tramp" Lawrence	5:17

Side two
No.	Title	Writer(s)	Length
5.	"City Kids"	Wallis, Duncan Sanderson	3:43
6.	"The Watcher"	Kilmister	4:50
7.	"Leaving Here"	Lamont Dozier, Brian Holland, Edward Holland	2:56
8.	"Lost Johnny"	Kilmister, Mick Farren	3:31
9.	"Fools"	Wallis, Brown	5:35
Total length:			36:59

EMI Records 1997 CD reissue bonus tracks
No.	Title	Length
10.	"On Parole" (Dave Edmunds Demo)	6:58
11.	"City Kids" (Dave Edmunds Demo)	3:48
12.	"Motörhead" (Dave Edmunds Demo)	2:48
13.	"Leaving Here" (Dave Edmunds Demo)	3:01
Total length:		52:27

== Personnel ==
Per the album's liner notes.

=== Motörhead ===
- Lemmy Kilmister – lead vocals, bass
- Larry Wallis – guitars, backing vocals, lead vocals on "Vibrator" and "Fools"
- Phil "Philthy Animal" Taylor – drums
- Lucas Fox – drums on "Lost Johnny" and bonus tracks 10–13, on the bonus tracks in the 1997 reedition, on all tracks on the 2020 remaster

=== Production ===
- Dave Edmunds – producer (tracks 10–13), engineer
- Motörhead – co-producers (track 10)
- Fritz Fryer – producer (tracks 1–9), engineer, mastering (on original)
- Terry Burch – mastering (1997 remaster)
- Paul Hicks – mixing (tracks 11–13 on 1997 remaster)

== Charts ==
Chart (1979)	Peak position
UK Albums (Official Charts)	65

Chart (2020)	Peak position
Hungarian Albums (MAHASZ)	31
UK Rock & Metal Albums (Official Charts)	16

== Release history ==
- 1979 – UK vinyl – United Artists Rockfile, LBR1004 – single white sleeve with George Bodnar black-and-white photographs of Lemmy on front and back
- 1981 – UK vinyl – Liberty, LN66125 – Black-and-white photograph of Lemmy, Wallis and Fox in the studio.
- 1982 – UK vinyl – EMI/Liberty Fame, FA3009 – single sleeve with colour photograph of Lemmy on stage.
- 1991 – USA CD – Cleopatra, CLEO-57212-2 – Black-and-white photograph of Lemmy, Wallis and Fox in studio.
- 1997 – UK CD – EMI, 8 54794 2 – Black on white Snaggletooth logo. Sleeve notes by Mick Farren. With bonus tracks.
- 2000 – UK CD – EMI Gold, 8 54794 2 – Black-and-white photograph of Lemmy, Wallis and Fox in the studio. With bonus tracks.
- 2004 – Netherlands CD – Disky, 901611 – Black-and-white photograph of Lemmy posing. With bonus tracks.
- 2020 – Europe vinyl & CD – Parlophone, LBR 1004X – Same cover art as 1981 Liberty release. With bonus tracks and exclusive booklet notes penned directly by Lucas Fox detailing the chaotic 1975 founding of the band with Lemmy.
