= Shine (Motörhead song) =

Single by Motörhead

from the album Another Perfect Day
- B-side: "(I'm Your) Hoochie Coochie Man (live)"
- Released: 22 July 1983
- Recorded: 1983
- Genre: Heavy metal; hard rock
- Length: 3:11
- Label: Bronze Records
- Songwriters: Brian Robertson; Ian Kilmister; Phil Taylor
- Producers: Tony Platt; John Verity

Motörhead singles chronology
"I Got Mine" (1983)	"Shine" (1983)	"Killed by Death" (1984)

"Shine" is a song by the English heavy metal band Motörhead taken from the Another Perfect Day album and released in 1983 on 7" and 12" vinyl. The B-side is "(I'm Your) Hoochie Coochie Man", recorded live at Sheffield University and Manchester Apollo on 9 June/10 June 1983. The 12" vinyl had a bonus track, a live version of "Don't Need Religion" from Manchester. Both B-sides appear as bonus tracks on the CD reissue of Another Perfect Day. "Shine" was originally demoed as the instrumental "Climber".

== Track listing ==
=== 7" ===
1. "Shine" (Ian Kilmister, Phil Taylor, Brian Robertson)
2. "(I'm Your) Hoochie Coochie Man" (live) (Willie Dixon)

=== 12" ===
1. "Shine" (Kilmister, Taylor, Robertson)
2. "(I'm Your) Hoochie Coochie Man" (live) (Dixon)
3. "(Don't Need) Religion" (live) (Kilmister, Eddie Clarke, Taylor)

== Personnel ==
- Guitars, piano – Brian "Robbo" Robertson
- Drums – Phil "Philthy Animal" Taylor
- Bass, lead vocals – Lemmy (Ian Kilmister)
- Sleeve Illustration and design: Polly Productions / Tony
- Photographs: Simon Porter / Fin Costello
