= Iron Fist (song) =

Single by Motörhead

from the album Iron Fist
- B-side: "Remember Me, I'm Gone"
- Released: March 1982
- Recorded: 26 January – 1 March 1982; Ramport Studios, UK; Morgan Studios
- Genre: Speed metal
- Length: 2:50
- Label: Bronze Records; Polydor
- Songwriters: Eddie Clarke; Lemmy; Phil Taylor
- Producers: Eddie Clarke; Will Reid Dick

Motörhead singles chronology
"Motorhead (live)" (1981)	"Iron Fist" (1982)	"I Got Mine" (1983)

"Iron Fist" is a song by the British heavy metal band Motörhead. It was released as a single in 1982, in 7" pressings in blue, black and translucent red vinyl.

The title track on the single is covered with (B-side's) "Remember Me, I'm Gone", which appears on CD re-issues of the Iron Fist album. In Spain, the title track was put on the B-side of "Go to Hell" and was issued with a picture sleeve of the band dressed as warriors in skull masks.

This is the last single featuring the classic Motörhead line-up of Lemmy, "Fast" Eddie Clarke and Phil "Philthy Animal" Taylor, as Clarke left following the recording of the Stand By Your Man EP.

On 27 March 1982, Lemmy, Clarke and Taylor were interviewed by Tommy Vance on BBC Radio 1's Rock on Saturday show, "Iron Fist", "Loser", and "Speedfreak" were played.

== Single track listing ==
1. "Iron Fist" (Eddie Clarke, Ian Kilmister, Phil Taylor) – 2:50
2. "Remember Me, I'm Gone" (Kilmister, Clarke, Taylor) – 2:26

== Personnel ==
- "Fast" Eddie Clarke – guitars, vocals
- Phil "Philthy Animal" Taylor – drums
- Lemmy (Ian Kilmister) – bass, lead vocals

== Cover versions ==
The Finnish folk metal band Korpiklaani covered the song on their 2011 album Ukon Wacka.

American hardcore band Pro-Pain covered the song on their 2003 album Run For Cover.

German Thrash metal band Sodom covered the song on their album Persecution Mania; a live version is on the compilation album Ten Black Years.

American thrash band Ringworm covered the song on a 2016 split release with Early Graves.

Metal Allegiance covered the song on their 2016 EP Fallen Heroes.

American metal band High on Fire covered the song for the 2022 tribute album Löve Me Förever: A Tribute To Motörhead.

British thrash metal band Onslaught covered the song on their 2025 album Origins of Aggression.
