= White Line Fever (book) =

2002 autobiography by Lemmy with Janiss Garza

- Cover of White Line Fever
- Author: Lemmy with Janiss Garza
- Cover artist: Nicola Ruebenberg
- Language: English
- Subject: Hard rock, Heavy metal music
- Genre: Autobiography
- Publisher: Simon & Schuster
- Publication date: 4 November 2002 (first edition)
- Publication place: United Kingdom
- Pages: 320
- ISBN: 0-684-85868-1 (hardback first edition)
- OCLC: 55625579

White Line Fever is the 2002 autobiography of Lemmy (Ian Fraser Kilmister), the founder of the British rock band Motörhead.

== Editions ==
- Simon & Schuster (Trade Division) ISBN 0-684-85868-1 Edition: Hardcover; November 4, 2002
- Pocket Books (a division of Simon & Schuster) ISBN 0-671-03331-X Edition: Paperback; June 2, 2003
- Citadel Press ISBN 0-8065-2590-8 Edition: Paperback; January 1, 2004
- Lemmy: La autobiografía (2ª ed.). Madrid: Es Pop. 2016. p. 352. ISBN 9788494458743.
