= Another Perfect Day =

Studio album by Motörhead
- Released: May 1983
- Recorded: February–March 1983
- Studios: Olympic, London; Eel Pie, London
- Genres: Heavy metal; hard rock
- Length: 44:09
- Label: Bronze
- Producer: Tony Platt

Motörhead chronology
What's Words Worth? (1983)	Another Perfect Day (1983)	No Remorse (1984)

Singles from Another Perfect Day
- 1. "I Got Mine" Released: May 1983; 2. "Shine" Released: July 1983

Another Perfect Day is the sixth studio album by English rock band Motörhead. Released in May 1983 by Bronze Records, it would be the band's last studio album with the label. It is the band's only studio album to feature lead guitarist Brian "Robbo" Robertson, best known for his work with Thin Lizzy.

== Recording ==
After lead guitarist "Fast" Eddie Clarke left Motörhead in 1982 in the midst of the band's Iron Fist US tour, guitarist Brian "Robbo" Robertson (ex-Thin Lizzy, Wild Horses) was recruited to complete the tour. Drummer Phil "Philthy Animal" Taylor, who had been a huge Thin Lizzy fan, had lobbied vocalist/bassist/band leader Lemmy to hire Robertson. The change was initially welcomed by both Lemmy and Taylor; in Joel McIver's book Overkill: The Untold Story of Motörhead, Lemmy is quoted at the time saying that the band's sound had:

"[the sound] changed a little now that Brian's joined the band; I think it's gotten more musical."

These feelings would change dramatically once they entered the studio with producer Tony Platt; Lemmy would recall years later in the Motörhead documentary The Guts and the Glory:

"Recording Another Perfect Day was fucking torture. Brian, he'd take seventeen hours doin' a guitar track. It fuckin' took so long compared with the other albums. And then when it was released everybody fucking hated it."

The original vinyl release featured a lyric-sheet insert, with a cartoon storyboard of the adventures of the new band, as it were. The cassette and US LP versions had a vastly different track list, with "I Got Mine" opening the album and "Back at the Funny Farm" opening side two. The band supported the album with the Another Perfect Tour tour, and almost immediately audiences and industry personnel alike took notice of the jarring contrast between Lemmy and Taylor, clad in their usual leathers, and Robertson, who took to wearing satin shorts and slip-on espadrille shoes onstage, which were becoming quite fashionable in the mid-1980s. In his 2002 autobiography White Line Fever, Lemmy writes:

"Brian's fashion sense continued to shock and horrify fans throughout the tour of Europe at the end of the year. Let's face it, ballet shoes and Motörhead do not mix!"

Lemmy began to make light of Robertson's attire during shows, but he explained to Classic Rock interviewer David Ling:

"All that shit about being dressed differently; all the wearing of stupid shorts, it was just to get at me. Or make sure everybody knew he wasn't in Motörhead, just a featured guest artist, doing us a favour from the great heights as a Thin Lizzy guitar player."

In his memoir, Lemmy put the album into perspective:

"We had to get another guitar player fast so we could continue the tour, and we chose Brian Robertson, who had been in Thin Lizzy. Technically, he was a better guitarist than Eddie, but ultimately he wasn't right for Motörhead. With Robbo our slide downwards began to pick up speed, which was unfair really, because the record we made with him, Another Perfect Day, was very good... Another Perfect Day stood the test of time – a lot of fans have recanted now and come to like it. But that didn't help us back then."

Following the album and tour, Robertson and Taylor left Motörhead to form the band Operator, leaving only Lemmy to continue on with Motörhead. Since then, "Shine", "Die You Bastard!", "Dancing on Your Grave", "I Got Mine", "Another Perfect Day", "One Track Mind", and "Rock It" have been featured in the band's live set. In 2013, Lemmy told Lee Marlow of Classic Rock that he hadn't spoken to Robertson since 1983 and maintained:

"I've enjoyed all the line-ups – but not that one. That was the lowest point in our career."

== Sleeve artwork ==
Joe Petagno, the sleeve artist, commented that the cover was inspired by the upheaval prevalent in the band and its members at the time:

"I didn't hear the music. I think I got a rough mix. It was different. But, I did it on a beer box, with a drawing board on my lap and some paints and a bucket of water by my side. And the reason it turned out the way it was – it was all chaos. Chaos in my life, and chaos in Lemmy's life. I brought it to London with me to deliver it personally to the guys and everyone was freaked over it. They'd never seen anything like it. And I remember Philthy said, "Fuck man! If the kids see that on acid, they're just going to freak!... It's one of my favourite sleeves."

In 1988 Castle Communications re-issued this album along with Overkill in a gatefold sleeve.

== Critical reception ==
Professional ratings
Review scores
Source	Rating
AllMusic	3.5/5 stars
Blabbermouth.net	9/10
Collector's Guide to Heavy Metal	9/10
The Encyclopedia of Popular Music	2/5 stars
Kerrang!	(unfavorable)
Spin Alternative Record Guide	3/10

John Franck of AllMusic calls Another Perfect Day "one of the most unique (albeit misunderstood) albums in the entire Motörhead catalog", adding that it is one of "the band's best-sounding records ever, but tinkering with a legendary formula is always fraught with danger (is that a boogie-woogie piano on 'Rock It'?), and as one might expect, the results here are alternately exhilarating and sometimes frustrating". Motörhead biographer Joel McIver wrote in 2011 that it was "worth revisiting for those who may have forgotten its genuine charms". Thrash metal band Sepultura named themselves after the third track from this album, "Dancing on Your Grave" ("sepultura" is "grave" in Portuguese). The songs "Back at the Funny Farm" and "Marching Off to War" were featured on the video game Brütal Legend.

== Track listing ==
=== Original edition ===
All tracks are written by Ian Kilmister, Phil Taylor and Brian Robertson.

Side one
No.	Title	Length
1.	"Back at the Funny Farm"	4:14
2.	"Shine"	3:11
3.	"Dancing on Your Grave"	4:29
4.	"Rock It"	3:55
5.	"One Track Mind"	5:55

Side two
No.	Title	Length
6.	"Another Perfect Day"	5:29
7.	"Marching Off to War"	4:11
8.	"I Got Mine"	5:24
9.	"Tales of Glory"	2:56
10.	"Die You Bastard!"	4:25
Total length:		44:09

=== Castle Communications 1996 reissue bonus tracks ===
No.	Title	Writer(s)	Original release	Length
11.	"Turn You Round Again"		1983 ~ I Got Mine	3:57
12.	"(I'm Your) Hoochie Coochie Man" (Live in 1983)	Willie Dixon	1983 ~ Shine	6:31
13.	"(Don't Need) Religion" (Live in 1983)	Kilmister, Clarke, Taylor	1983 ~ Shine	2:54

=== Sanctuary Records 2006 2-CD deluxe edition ===
- Disc one is the original album minus the bonus tracks, except the B-side of the "I Got Mine" single.
- Disc two is a full live recording of the concert at the Manchester Apollo in Manchester, 10 June 1983.

All tracks are written by Kilmister, Taylor, Robertson except where noted.

Disc 2 (Live at Manchester 02 Apollo, 10 June 1983)
No.	Title	Writer(s)	Original release	Length
1.	"Back at the Funny Farm"		1983 ~ Another Perfect Day	4:06
2.	"Tales of Glory"		1983 ~ Another Perfect Day	3:40
3.	"Heart of Stone"	Kilmister, Clarke, Taylor	1982 ~ Iron Fist	3:11
4.	"Shoot You in the Back"	Kilmister, Clarke, Taylor	1980 ~ Ace of Spades	2:43
5.	"Marching Off to War"		1983 ~ Another Perfect Day	4:48
6.	"Iron Horse/Born to Lose"	Taylor, Mick Brown, Guy Lawrence	1977 ~ Motörhead	3:45
7.	"Another Perfect Day"		1983 ~ Another Perfect Day	5:38
8.	"(I'm Your) Hoochie Coochie Man"	Dixon	1983 ~ Shine	6:39
9.	"(Don't Need) Religion"	Kilmister, Clarke, Taylor	1982 ~ Iron Fist	2:43
10.	"One Track Mind"		1983 ~ Another Perfect Day	6:12
11.	"Go to Hell"	Kilmister, Clarke, Taylor	1982 ~ Iron Fist	2:59
12.	"America"	Kilmister, Clarke, Taylor	1982 ~ Iron Fist	4:25
13.	"Shine"		1983 ~ Another Perfect Day	3:08
14.	"Dancing on Your Grave"		1983 ~ Another Perfect Day	5:42
15.	"Rock It"		1983 ~ Another Perfect Day	4:38
16.	"I Got Mine"		1983 ~ Another Perfect Day	5:36
17.	"Bite the Bullet"	Kilmister, Clarke, Taylor	1980 ~ Ace of Spades	1:34
18.	"The Chase Is Better Than the Catch"	Kilmister, Clarke, Taylor	1980 ~ Ace of Spades	5:42

=== 40th anniversary 2-CD edition ===
The 40th anniversary edition of Another Perfect Day was released on 3 November 2023. The instrumental demo "Climber" is the early version of what would become later as the track "Shine".

- Disc one is the original album plus the three bonus tracks from the Castle Communications 1996 reissue, plus the four following demos.

40th anniversary edition bonus demos
No.	Title	Length
14.	"Climber" (Demo)
15.	"Fast One" (Demo)
16.	"Chinese" (Demo)
17.	"Climber" (Instrumental Demo)

- Disc two is the (previously unreleased) full live recording of the concert at the Hull City Hall in Hull, 22 June 1983

All tracks are written by Kilmister, Taylor, Robertson except where noted.

Disc 2 (Live at Hull City Hall, 22 June 1983)
No.	Title	Writer(s)	Original release	Length
1.	"Back at the Funny Farm"		1983 ~ Another Perfect Day
2.	"Heart of Stone"	Kilmister, Clarke, Taylor	1982 ~ Iron Fist
3.	"Shoot You in the Back"	Kilmister, Clarke, Taylor	1980 ~ Ace of Spades
4.	"Marching Off to War"		1983 ~ Another Perfect Day
5.	"Iron Horse/Born to Lose"	Taylor, Mick Brown, Guy Lawrence	1977 ~ Motörhead
6.	"Another Perfect Day"		1983 ~ Another Perfect Day
7.	"(I'm Your) Hoochie Coochie Man"	Dixon	1983 ~ Shine
8.	"(Don't Need) Religion"	Kilmister, Clarke, Taylor	1982 ~ Iron Fist
9.	"One Track Mind"		1983 ~ Another Perfect Day
10.	"Go to Hell"	Kilmister, Clarke, Taylor	1982 ~ Iron Fist
11.	"America"	Kilmister, Clarke, Taylor	1982 ~ Iron Fist
12.	"Shine"		1983 ~ Another Perfect Day
13.	"Dancing on Your Grave"		1983 ~ Another Perfect Day
14.	"Rock It"		1983 ~ Another Perfect Day
15.	"Bite the Bullet"	Kilmister, Clarke, Taylor	1980 ~ Ace of Spades
16.	"The Chase Is Better Than the Catch"	Kilmister, Clarke, Taylor	1980 ~ Ace of Spades

== Personnel ==
Per the album's liner notes.

- Lemmy – bass, vocals
- Brian "Robbo" Robertson – guitars, piano on "Rock It", Fender piano on "Shine" and backing vocals on "Back at the Funny Farm"
- Phil "Philthy Animal" Taylor – drums

=== Production ===
- Tony Platt – producer, mixing
- Andy Pearce – mastering (2006 remaster)
- Joe Petagno – Snaggletooth
- Curt Evans – 2006 cover design

=== 2006 deluxe edition remaster ===
- Steve Hammonds – release coordination
- Jon Richards – release coordination
- Malcolm Dome – sleeve notes
- Mick Stevenson – project consultant, photos, and archive memorabilia

== Charts ==
1983 chart performance for Another Perfect Day
Chart (1983)	Peak position
Australian Albums (Kent Music Report)	89
Dutch Albums (Album Top 100)	39
Finnish Albums (The Official Finnish Charts)	17
German Albums (Offizielle Top 100)	31
Swedish Albums (Sverigetopplistan)	18
UK Albums (Official Charts)	20
US Billboard 200	153

2023 chart performance for Another Perfect Day
Chart (2023)	Peak position
Austrian Albums (Ö3 Austria)	30
German Albums (Offizielle Top 100)	24
Scottish Albums (Official Charts)	22
Swiss Albums (Schweizer Hitparade)	39
UK Independent Albums (Official Charts)	9
UK Rock & Metal Albums (Official Charts)	2
