= Motörhead (album) =

Studio album by Motörhead
- Released: 12 August 1977
- Recorded: 1–3 April 1977 (or 27–29 April 1977)
- Studios: Escape, Kent
- Genres: Heavy metal; hard rock; punk rock
- Length: 32:52
- Label: Chiswick
- Producer: Speedy Keen

Motörhead chronology
Motörhead (1977)	Overkill (1979)

Singles from Motörhead
- 1. "Motorhead" Released: 17 June 1977

Motörhead is the debut studio album by English heavy metal band Motörhead. It was released on 12 August 1977 by pub rock and early punk rock label Chiswick Records, one of the first for the label, and the band's only release under Chiswick. The album contains the line-up of Lemmy Kilmister on bass and vocals, "Fast" Eddie Clarke on lead guitar, and Philthy Animal Taylor on drums. The sleeve artwork featured the debut of Snaggletooth, the War-Pig, the fanged face logo created by artist Joe Petagno that would become an icon of the band.

An earlier album, On Parole, was recorded in 1975–76 for United Artists, but was released only in November 1979.

== Background ==
Motörhead hired lead guitarist "Fast" Eddie Clarke in March 1976, and he was originally to serve as the band's second guitarist along with Larry Wallis in what was intended to be a four-piece lineup, but Wallis left shortly after for his own reasons. Sensing that the fledgling band had dim prospects for success, Motörhead decided to disband after playing one final show at the Marquee Club in London in April 1977. Ted Carroll, founder of the upstart Chiswick Records label, knew Lemmy well from his rare 45 Record's store in London of which Lemmy was a frequent customer. Carroll decided to give the band a break and hosted what was planned to be their final performance at the Marquee on 1 April 1977. The decision was made to record the gig. As Clarke recalls in the documentary The Guts and the Glory:

"It was going to be our farewell gig. I said, Let's get a mobile down at least to record the fuckin' year and a half we've been together and put something on the fuckin' tape, you know? The problem with the Marquee was they wanted 500 quid for doing a recording at the Marquee. Well, that was out of the question in those days."

Feeling that the band had already seen its share of adversity, Carroll offered the band two days of studio time at Escape Studios in Kent, England, to record a single with producer John "Speedy" Keen. As Clarke explained to John Robinson of Uncut in 2015, the band finished the gig at the Marquee and drove straight to the studio in Kent for a weekend of recording:

"That was Friday night, so we had all Saturday and Sunday. We'd been playing these songs for a year, so we thought fuck it, we can do an album. In a few hours we had all the backing tracks down. Put the vocals down. Bit more speed, put some more guitars on. Few more beers – we were fucking steaming. Come Saturday night, we'd nearly finished it."

== Recording ==
Due to the very limited studio time afforded to the band, the decision was made to re-record the unreleased United Artists album almost in its entirety; only "Fools" and "Leaving Here" weren't re-recorded at the Kent sessions. In addition, two new self-penned compositions, "White Line Fever" and "Keep Us on the Road", were added, as well as a cover of Tiny Bradshaw's "Train Kept A-Rollin". Three tracks on the album were actually composed by Lemmy while he was still a member of Hawkwind, "Motorhead", "Lost Johnny", and "The Watcher", the latter a psychedelic acoustic piece. Like the band name itself, the song "Motorhead" is a reference to speed – Lemmy's drug of choice at that time- and was coupled with the non-album track "City Kids" (a Larry Wallis composition from his Pink Fairies' days) for release as 7" and 12" singles. In his autobiography White Line Fever, Lemmy recalls working with producer Speedy Keen and engineer John Burns and the challenges arising from a lack of time:

"(They) were speeding out of their heads because they couldn't afford to go to sleep – they didn't have time, and they wanted to make an album as much as we did. They mixed twenty-four versions of Motörhead alone!"

The band members were less than pleased with the finished product, and guitarist Clarke has referred to the album's muddled sound as "pretty dreadful". Four remaining tracks from the session were shelved until 1980, when they were released as the Beer Drinkers and Hell Raisers EP. In his memoir Lemmy noted:

"Once again it was cash-in time – for the record labels, at least. I've never recorded more than we need since! But having said that, I don't begrudge Ted Carroll that – he saved my band."

The B-side and the EP tracks were later added as bonus material on the CD release.

== Cover artwork ==
The sleeve artwork featured the debut of Snaggletooth, the War-Pig, the fanged face that would become an icon of the band and would appear on most of the band's album covers. Snaggletooth was created by artist Joe Petagno, who had earlier worked with Storm Thorgerson of Hipgnosis and had designed the Swan Song Records logo for Led Zeppelin. According to its creator, Snaggletooth represents a combination of a bear, a wolf and a dog skull with boar tusks. The original Motörhead album cover contained a swastika on the spike of the helmet, though it was removed from future copies of the album.

== Release ==
The inner sleeve featured old and new photographs of the band and friends by longtime friend Motorcycle Irene, who took most of the 70's pictures of Motörhead, plus letters of thanks from Lemmy, Eddie and Phil. Advertisements for the album, single, and tour bore the words "Achtung! This Band Takes No Prisoners".

- 12 August 1977 – UK vinyl – Chiswick, WIK2 – First 1000 printed black on silver foil sleeve. With inner sleeve.
- 10 November 1979 – UK vinyl – Chiswick/EMI, CWK3008 – The first 10,000 copies pressed on white vinyl, with "White vinyl fever" written on cover. Later versions had a gold stamped promo sleeve.
- 1981 – UK vinyl – Big Beat, WIK 2 – Red "Motörhead" lettering and "Includes inner sleeve with rare pix" written on cover. With inner sleeve. Black, clear and red (16,000 copies) vinyl editions.
- Big Beat have also issued a Direct Metal Mastered LP edition.
- One-sided test pressings (used in the trade; not mis-presses) escaped the pressing plant and are on the market.
- 1988 – UK CD – Big Beat, CDWIK 2 – Red "Motörhead" lettering and "Plus 5 more headbanging tracks!!!" written on cover. With Bonus tracks.
- 2 April 2001 – UK CD – Big Beat, CDWIKM 2 – Red "Motörhead" lettering. With bonus tracks. Liner notes by Ted Carroll.
- 16 July 2007 – UK vinyl – Devils Jukebox, DJB006LP – 180 g vinyl replica of original silver foil vinyl edition limited to 666 copies. First 100 with one sided 12" silver vinyl featuring the 5 bonus tracks, and poster.
- 8 October 2007 – UK CD – Big Beat, CDHP021 – CD replica of original silver foil vinyl edition limited to 3,000 copies.

== Critical reception ==
Professional ratings
Review scores
Source	Rating
AllMusic	3/5 stars
Classic Rock	4.5/5 stars
Collector's Guide to Heavy Metal	7/10
The Encyclopedia of Popular Music	3/5 stars
Spin Alternative Record Guide	7/10

Alex Ogg of AllMusic wrote: "Though only a minor chart success, Motörhead patented the group's style: Lemmy's rasping vocal over a speeding juggernaut of guitar, bass, and drums...no wonder the punks liked them." Many critics have noted that the album is not as polished as later works like Bomber and Ace of Spades.

Assessing the album and its debut single in 2011, biographer Joel McIver stated: "with the benefit of hindsight it's glaringly obvious that neither comes close to capturing the group's mesmerizing live sound."

Kris Needs of Loudersound praises the album, saying "Although the roller-coaster sound can be uneven and The Watcher still embedded in west London space-rock, Motörhead still sounds like the kamikaze rampage of desperate men granted one last shot, surging through speed-driven carnage to snatch triumph from oblivion."

== Track listing ==
Side one
No.	Title	Writer(s)	Length
1.	"Motörhead"	Ian Kilmister	3:13
2.	"Vibrator"	Larry Wallis, Des Brown	3:39
3.	"Lost Johnny"	Kilmister, Michael Farren	4:15
4.	"Iron Horse/Born to Lose"	Phil Taylor, Mick Brown, Guy "Tramp" Lawrence	5:21

Side two
No.	Title	Writer(s)	Length
5.	"White Line Fever"	Kilmister, Eddie Clarke, Taylor	2:38
6.	"Keep Us on the Road"	Kilmister, Clarke, Taylor, Farren	5:57
7.	"The Watcher"	Kilmister	4:30
8.	"Train Kept A-Rollin'"	Myron Bradshaw, Howard Kay, Lois Mann	3:19
Total length:			32:52

Big Beat Records 1988 & Chiswick/Ace Records 2001 CD reissues & remaster bonus tracks
No.	Title	Writer(s)	Original release	Length
9.	"City Kids" (Pink Fairies cover)	Wallis, Duncan Sanderson	1977 ~ Motörhead (NS 13 single B-Side)	3:24
10.	"Beer Drinkers and Hell Raisers" (ZZ Top cover)	Billy Gibbons, Dusty Hill, Frank Beard	1980 ~ Beer Drinkers and Hell Raisers	3:27
11.	"On Parole"	Wallis	1980 ~ Beer Drinkers and Hell Raisers	5:57
12.	"Instro"	Kilmister, Clarke, Taylor	1980 ~ Beer Drinkers and Hell Raisers	2:27
13.	"I'm Your Witchdoctor" (John Mayall and the Bluesbreakers cover)	John Mayall	1980 ~ Beer Drinkers and Hell Raisers	2:58
Total length:				52:14

40th Anniversary Chiswick/Ace Records 2017 CD reissue & bonus tracks
No.	Title	Writer(s)	Original release	Length
14.	"Lost Johnny" (Mix 2)	Kilmister, Farren	1977 ~ Motörhead	4:17
15.	"City Kids" (Mix 1)	Wallis, Sanderson	1977 ~ Motörhead (single)	3:23
16.	"I'm Your Witchdoctor" (Alternative Mix)	Mayall	1980 ~ Beer Drinkers and Hell Raisers	2:58
17.	"The Watcher" (Mix 3)	Kilmister	1977 ~ Motörhead	4:32
18.	"White Line Fever" (Mix 7)	Kilmister, Clarke, Taylor	1977 ~ Motörhead	2:35
19.	"Keep Us on the Road" (Mix 1)	Kilmister, Clarke, Taylor, Farren	1977 ~ Motörhead	6:05
20.	"Motörhead" (Alternative Vocals & Guitar Solo)	Kilmister	1977 ~ Motörhead	3:12
Total length:				79:16

== Personnel ==
Adapted from the album's liner notes.

=== Motörhead ===
- Lemmy – lead vocals, bass
- "Fast" Eddie Clarke – guitar, backing vocals, co-lead vocals (on "Beer Drinkers and Hell Raisers" and "I'm Your Witch Doctor")
- Phil "Philthy Animal" Taylor – drums

=== Production ===
- John "Speedy" Keen – producer
- John Burns – engineer
- Adam Skeaping – mastering
- Motörhead – executive producers
- Joe Petagno – album cover & Snaggletooth
- Motorcycle Irene and Lensy – photography

== Charts ==
Chart (1977)	Peak position
UK Albums (Official Charts)	43

Chart (1981)	Peak position
UK Albums (Official Charts)	76

Chart (2017)	Peak position
UK Independent Albums (Official Charts)	45
UK Rock & Metal Albums (Official Charts)	18

== Certifications ==
Region	Certification	Certified units/sales
United Kingdom (BPI)	Silver	60,000^{^}
^{^} Shipments figures based on certification alone.
