= Stone Deaf Forever! =

Box set by Motörhead
- Released: 7 October 2003
- Recorded: 1975–2002
- Genre: Heavy metal
- Length: 6:18:16
- Labels: Castle, Sanctuary
- Compiler: Motörhead

Motörhead chronology
Hellraiser: Best of the Epic Years (2003)	Stone Deaf Forever! (2003)	Live at Brixton Academy (2003)

Professional ratings
Review scores
Source	Rating
AllMusic	3/5 stars
The Encyclopedia of Popular Music	3/5 stars

Stone Deaf Forever! is a 5-CD box set collection by the band Motörhead, released in 2003.

== Recording ==
Stone Deaf Forever! is the first fully comprehensive box set collection covering the band's career from 1975 to 2002 and is the first box set to be issued with full band approval: the track listing was compiled in association with the band and its fan club.

The accompanying 60-page booklet contains a new 12,000-word essay by rock journalist Mick Wall and previously unpublished photos and information. Also included is a full colour replica tour poster and a Motörhead button. The cover art features a newly commissioned painting by longtime Motörhead artist Joe Petagno.

Nineteen tracks made their CD debut on this set, although a number have since been included on Motörhead reissues and most significantly the BBC Live & In-Session set.

== Track listing ==
Disc 1: 1975 ~ 1980
No.	Title	Writer(s)	Original album	Length
1.	"Motorhead" (Performed by Hawkwind)	Ian Kilmister	1975 ~ "Kings of Speed"
2.	"Lost Johnny"	Kilmister, Mick Farren	1979 ~ On Parole
3.	"Leaving Here"	Brian Holland, Lamont Dozier, Eddie Holland	1977 ~ "Leaving Here / White Line Fever"
4.	"White Line Fever (Stiff)"	Eddie Clarke, Kilmister, Phil Taylor	1977 ~ "Leaving Here / White Line Fever"
5.	"The Watcher"	Kilmister,	1977 ~ Motörhead
6.	"City Kids"	Larry Wallis, Duncan Sanderson	1977 ~ "Motorhead" (Single)
7.	"I'm Your Witchdoctor"	John Mayall	1980 ~ Beer Drinkers and Hell Raisers
8.	"Motorhead"	Kilmister	1977 ~ Motörhead
9.	"Louie, Louie" (BBC Session 1978)	Richard Berry	2005 ~ BBC Live & In-Session
10.	"Keep Us on the Road" (BBC Session 1978)	Clarke, Kilmister, Taylor, Farren	2005 ~ BBC Live & In-Session
11.	"Tear Ya Down" (BBC Session 1978)	Clarke, Kilmister, Taylor	2005 ~ BBC Live & In-Session
12.	"I'll Be Your Sister" (BBC Session 1978)	Clarke, Kilmister, Taylor	2005 ~ BBC Live & In-Session
13.	"Overkill"	Clarke, Kilmister, Taylor	1979 ~ Overkill
14.	"Stay Clean"	Clarke, Kilmister, Taylor	1979 ~ Overkill
15.	"Capricorn"	Clarke, Kilmister, Taylor	1979 ~ Overkill
16.	"Limb From Limb"	Clarke, Kilmister, Taylor	1979 ~ Overkill
17.	"Dead Men Tell No Tales"	Clarke, Kilmister, Taylor	1979 ~ Bomber
18.	"Stone Dead Forever"	Clarke, Kilmister, Taylor	1979 ~ Bomber
19.	"Step Down"	Clarke, Kilmister, Taylor	1979 ~ Bomber
20.	"Bomber"	Clarke, Kilmister, Taylor	1979 ~ Bomber
21.	"Over the Top" (Performed by The Damned, featuring Lemmy & "Philthy Animal" Taylor)	Clarke, Kilmister, Taylor	1980 ~ "Over the Top" (Unreleased Damned Single)
22.	"Shoot You in the Back"	Clarke, Kilmister, Taylor	1980 ~ Ace of Spades

Disc 2: 1980 ~ 1986
No.	Title	Writer(s)	Original album	Length
1.	"Ace of Spades"	Clarke, Kilmister, Taylor	1980 ~ Ace of Spades
2.	"Bite the Bullet"	Clarke, Kilmister, Taylor	1980 ~ Ace of Spades
3.	"The Chase Is Better Than the Catch"	Clarke, Kilmister, Taylor	1980 ~ Ace of Spades
4.	"Live to Win" (BBC Session 1981)	Clarke, Kilmister, Taylor	2005 ~ BBC Live & In-Session
5.	"Like a Nightmare" (BBC Session 1981)	Clarke, Kilmister, Taylor	2005 ~ BBC Live & In-Session
6.	"Please Don't Touch" (Featuring Girlschool)	Johnny Kidd, Guy Robinson	1981 ~ St. Valentine's Day Massacre
7.	"Iron Fist"	Clarke, Kilmister, Taylor	1982 ~ Iron Fist
8.	"Heart of Stone"	Clarke, Kilmister, Taylor	1982 ~ Iron Fist
9.	"(Don't Need) Religion"	Clarke, Kilmister, Taylor	1982 ~ Iron Fist
10.	"Shine"	Brian Robertson, Kilmister, Taylor	1983 ~ Another Perfect Day
11.	"One Track Mind"	Robertson, Kilmister, Taylor	1983 ~ Another Perfect Day
12.	"I Got Mine"	Robertson, Kilmister, Taylor	1983 ~ Another Perfect Day
13.	"Snaggletooth"	Phil Campbell, Michael Burston, Kilmister, Pete Gill	1984 ~ No Remorse
14.	"Under the Knife (Slow)"	Campbell, Burston, Kilmister, Gill	1984 ~ "Killed by Death"
15.	"Ain't My Crime"	Campbell, Burston, Kilmister, Gill	1986 ~ Orgasmatron
16.	"Nothing Up My Sleeve"	Campbell, Burston, Kilmister, Gill	1986 ~ Orgasmatron
17.	"Killed by Death" (BBC Session 1986)	Campbell, Burston, Kilmister, Gill	2005 ~ BBC Live & In-Session
18.	"Deaf Forever" (BBC Session 1986)	Campbell, Burston, Kilmister, Gill	2005 ~ BBC Live & In-Session
19.	"Orgasmatron (Spoken Words)" (BBC Session 1986)	Kilmister	2005 ~ BBC Live & In-Session
20.	"Orgasmatron" (BBC Session 1986)	Campbell, Burston, Kilmister, Gill	2005 ~ BBC Live & In-Session
21.	"Doctor Rock" (BBC Session 1986)	Campbell, Burston, Kilmister, Gill	2005 ~ BBC Live & In-Session

Disc 3: 1987 ~ 1996
No.	Title	Writer(s)	Original album	Length
1.	"Rock 'N' Roll"	Campbell, Burston, Kilmister, Taylor	1987 ~ Rock 'N' Roll
2.	"Eat the Rich"	Campbell, Burston, Kilmister, Taylor	1987 ~ Rock 'N' Roll
3.	"Just 'Cos You Got the Power"	Campbell, Burston, Kilmister, Taylor	1987 ~ "Eat the Rich"
4.	"The Black Leather Jacket"	Campbell, Burston, Kilmister, Taylor	1989 ~ Channel 4 TV Programme
5.	"No Voices in the Sky"	Campbell, Burston, Kilmister, Taylor	1991 ~ 1916
6.	"Going to Brazil"	Campbell, Burston, Kilmister, Taylor	1991 ~ 1916
7.	"Love Me Forever"	Campbell, Burston, Kilmister, Taylor	1991 ~ 1916
8.	"You Better Run" (Featuring Slash)	Kilmister	1992 ~ March ör Die
9.	"I Ain't No Nice Guy" (Featuring Ozzy Osbourne & Slash)	Kilmister	1992 ~ March ör Die
10.	"Hell on Earth"	Kilmister	1992 ~ Hellraiser III: Hell on Earth (Soundtrack)
11.	"Burner"	Campbell, Burston, Kilmister, Mikkey Dee	1993 ~ Bastards
12.	"I Am the Sword"	Campbell, Burston, Kilmister, Dee	1993 ~ Bastards
13.	"Bad Woman"	Campbell, Burston, Kilmister, Dee	1993 ~ Bastards
14.	"Devils"	Campbell, Burston, Kilmister, Dee	1993 ~ Bastards
15.	"Sacrifice"	Campbell, Burston, Kilmister, Dee	1995 ~ Sacrifice
16.	"Sex & Death"	Campbell, Burston, Kilmister, Dee	1995 ~ Sacrifice
17.	"Over Your Shoulder"	Campbell, Burston, Kilmister, Dee	1995 ~ Sacrifice
18.	"Out of the Sun"	Campbell, Kilmister, Dee	1995 ~ Sacrifice
19.	"I Don't Believe a Word"	Campbell, Kilmister, Dee	1996 ~ Overnight Sensation

Disc 4: 1996 ~ 2002
No.	Title	Writer(s)	Original album	Length
1.	"Overnight Sensation"	Campbell, Kilmister, Dee	1996 ~ Overnight Sensation
2.	"Broken"	Campbell, Kilmister, Dee	1996 ~ Overnight Sensation
3.	"Listen to Your Heart"	Kilmister	1996 ~ Overnight Sensation
4.	"Love for Sale"	Campbell, Kilmister, Dee	1998 ~ Snake Bite Love
5.	"Snake Bite Love"	Campbell, Kilmister, Dee	1998 ~ Snake Bite Love
6.	"Take the Blame"	Campbell, Kilmister, Dee	1998 ~ Snake Bite Love
7.	"Joy of Labour"	Campbell, Kilmister, Dee	1998 ~ Snake Bite Love
8.	"Orgasmatron 2000"	Campbell, Burston, Kilmister, Gill	2000 ~ Internet download
9.	"Stay Out of Jail"	Campbell, Kilmister, Dee	2000 ~ We Are Motörhead
10.	"One More Fucking Time"	Campbell, Kilmister, Dee	2000 ~ We Are Motörhead
11.	"We Are Motörhead"	Campbell, Kilmister, Dee	2000 ~ We Are Motörhead
12.	"Shoot 'Em Down"	Dee Snider	2001 ~ Twisted Forever: - A Tribute to the Legendary Twisted Sister
13.	"Walk a Crooked Mile"	Campbell, Kilmister, Dee	2002 ~ Hammered
14.	"Brave New World"	Campbell, Kilmister, Dee	2002 ~ Hammered
15.	"Mine All Mine"	Campbell, Kilmister, Dee	2002 ~ Hammered
16.	"Voices From the War"	Campbell, Kilmister, Dee	2002 ~ Hammered

Disc 5 (Live): 1978 ~ 2002
No.	Title	Writer(s)	Original album	Length
1.	"On Parole" (Live in 1978)	Wallis	1983 ~ What's Words Worth?
2.	"Train Kept A-Rollin'" (Live in 1978)	Tiny Bradshaw, Howard Kay, Lois Mann	1983 ~ What's Words Worth?
3.	"Too Late, Too Late" (BBC In-Concert 1979)	Clarke, Kilmister, Taylor	2005 ~ BBC Live & In-Session
4.	"(I Won't) Pay Your Price" (BBC In-Concert 1979)	Clarke, Kilmister, Taylor	2005 ~ BBC Live & In-Session
5.	"Iron Horse / Born to Lose" (Live in 1980)	Taylor, Brown, Lawrence	1981 ~ No Sleep 'til Hammersmith
6.	"(We Are) The Road Crew" (Live in 1981)	Clarke, Kilmister, Taylor	1981 ~ No Sleep 'til Hammersmith
7.	"Nadine" (Live in 1983)	Chuck Berry	1983 ~ Lyon France 18-10-1983 (Live Bootleg)
8.	"Steal Your Face" (BBC In-Concert 1986)	Campbell, Burston, Kilmister, Gill	1987 ~ Rock 'N' Roll (2006 Deluxe Edition)
9.	"Mean Machine" (Live in 1985)	Campbell, Burston, Kilmister, Gill	1985 ~ The Birthday Party
10.	"No Class" (Live in 1985, Featuring Wendy O. Williams)	Clarke, Kilmister, Taylor	1985 ~ The Birthday Party
11.	"Stone Deaf in the U.S.A." (Live in 1987)	Campbell, Burston, Kilmister, Taylor	1994 ~ Live at Brixton '87
12.	"Dogs" (Live in 1987)	Campbell, Burston, Kilmister, Taylor	1994 ~ Live at Brixton '87
13.	"Traitor" (Live in 1988)	Campbell, Burston, Kilmister, Taylor	1988 ~ Nö Sleep at All
14.	"Built for Speed" (Live in 1988)	Campbell, Burston, Kilmister, Gill	1988 ~ Nö Sleep at All
15.	"Acropolis (Metropolis)" (Live in 1988)	Clarke, Kilmister, Taylor	1988 ~ Live at Athens
16.	"Angel City" (Live in 1991)	Kilmister	1991 ~ 1916 Live...Everything Louder than Everything Else
17.	"R.A.M.O.N.E.S." (Live in 1991)	Campbell, Burston, Kilmister, Taylor	1991 ~ 1916 Live...Everything Louder than Everything Else
18.	"Silver Machine" (Live in 1995)	Robert Calvert, Dave Brock	Unreleased Live Recording
19.	"On Your Feet or on Your Knees" (Live in 1998)	Campbell, Burston, Kilmister, Dee	1999 ~ Everything Louder Than Everyone Else
20.	"I'm So Bad (Baby I Don't Care)" (Live in 1998)	Campbell, Burston, Kilmister, Taylor	1999 ~ Everything Louder Than Everyone Else
21.	"Born to Raise Hell" (Live in 1998)	Kilmister	1999 ~ Everything Louder Than Everyone Else

== Personnel ==
- Lemmy (Ian Kilmister) – bass guitar, lead vocals
- Larry Wallis – guitar (track 1.2)
- "Fast" Eddie Clarke – guitar (tracks 1.3–2.9)
- Brian "Robbo" Robertson – guitar (tracks 2.10–2.12)
- Phil "Wizzö" Campbell – guitar (tracks 2.13–4.16)
- Würzel (Michael Burston) – guitar (tracks 2.13–3.18)
- Lucas Fox – drums (track 1.2)
- Phil "Philthy Animal" Taylor – drums (tracks 1.2–2.12, 3.1–3.7)
- Pete Gill – drums (tracks 2.13–2.21)
- Tommy Aldridge – drums (tracks 3.8–3.10)
- Mikkey Dee – drums (tracks 3.11–4.16)
