= 25 & Alive Boneshaker =

Video by Motörhead
- Released: 13 November 2001
- Recorded: 22 October 2000
- Venue: Brixton Academy, Brixton, London, UK
- Genre: Heavy metal
- Length: 158 min
- Label: Steamhammer/SPV
- Producer: Motörhead

Motörhead chronology
Motörhead Live: Everything Löuder than Everything Else (1991)	25 & Alive Boneshaker (2001)	Stage Fright (2005)

Live at Brixton Academy CD cover

Motörhead chronology
Stone Deaf Forever! (2003)	Live at Brixton Academy (2003)	Inferno (2004)

Professional ratings
Review scores
Source	Rating
AllMusic	(DVD)
The Encyclopedia of Popular Music	(CD)

25 & Alive Boneshaker is a live DVD released in November 2001 featuring Motörhead's 25th anniversary concert at Brixton Academy on 22 October 2000. The concert has also been released as the band's seventh live album entitled Live at Brixton Academy on a double live CD in December 2003. It was issued by Steamhammer in Europe and by Sanctuary Records subsidiary Metal-Is in North America.

Various guests made appearances on the night; "Fast" Eddie Clarke (ex-Motörhead), Queen's Brian May, Todd Campbell (Phil's son), Paul Inder (Lemmy's son), Whitfield Crane (ex-Ugly Kid Joe), Doro Pesch (ex-Warlock) and Ace (Skunk Anansie).

The DVD also includes an acoustic session recorded at IHT Studios, Clapham, some Motörhead archive film, interviews with the band and their guests, and songs filmed at the Wacken Open Air on 4 August 2001.

== Gold Disc ==
In June 2008, Motörhead received Gold Disc presentations for sales in Germany exceeding 25,000 copies of the 25 & Alive Boneshaker DVD.

== Cover artwork ==
Joe Petagno, long time sleeve artist for the band, commented on the concept behind the cover for the DVD:

The idea was to create the feeling of tour posters being torn off the wall, one layer at a time, from 1975 to the present day... That was the basic idea: to create this montage of Motörhead through the years.

== Track listings ==
All tracks are written by Kilmister, Clarke, Taylor except where noted.

DVD Tracklist
No.	Title	Writer(s)	Original Release	Length
1.	"We Are Motörhead"	Kilmister, Phil Campbell, Mikkey Dee	2000 ~ We Are Motörhead
2.	"No Class"		1979 ~ Overkill
3.	"I'm So Bad (Baby I Don't Care)"	Kilmister, Campbell, Michael Burston, Taylor	1991 ~ 1916
4.	"Over Your Shoulder"	Kilmister, Campbell, Burston, Dee	1995 ~ Sacrifice
5.	"Civil War"	Kilmister, Campbell, Dee, Max Ax	1996 ~ Overnight Sensation
6.	"Metropolis"		1979 ~ Overkill
7.	"Overnight Sensation"	Kilmister, Campbell, Dee	1996 ~ Overnight Sensation
8.	"God Save the Queen"	John Lydon, Steve Jones, Glen Matlock, Paul Cook	2000 ~ We Are Motörhead
9.	"Born to Raise Hell" (Feat. Doro Pesch & Whitfield Crane)	Kilmister	1993 ~ Bastards
10.	"The Chase Is Better Than the Catch" (Feat. "Fast" Eddie Clarke)		1980 ~ Ace of Spades
11.	"Stay Out of Jail"	Kilmister, Campbell, Dee	2000 ~ We Are Motörhead
12.	"Dead Men Tell No Tales"		1979 ~ Bomber
13.	"You Better Run"	Kilmister, Campbell, Burston,	1992 ~ March ör Die
14.	"Sacrifice"	Kilmister, Campbell, Burston, Dee	1995 ~ Sacrifice
15.	"Orgasmatron"	Kilmister, Campbell, Burston, Pete Gill	1986 ~ Orgasmatron
16.	"Going to Brazil"	Kilmister, Campbell, Burston, Taylor	1991 ~ 1916
17.	"Broken"	Kilmister, Campbell, Burston, Taylor	1996 ~ Overnight Sensation
18.	"Damage Case"	Kilmister, Clarke, Taylor, Mick Farren	1979 ~ Overkill
19.	"Iron Fist"		1982 ~ Iron Fist
20.	"Killed by Death" (Feat. Paul Inder [Lemmy's Son] & Todd Campbell [Phil's Son])	Kilmister, Campbell, Burston, Gill	1984 ~ No Remorse
21.	"Bomber"		1979 ~ Bomber
22.	"Ace of Spades"		1980 ~ Ace of Spades
23.	"Overkill" (Feat. "Fast" Eddie Clarke, Brian May & Martin "Ace" Kent)		1979 ~ Overkill

Live at Brixton Academy Disc 1
No.	Title	Length
1.	"We Are Motörhead"	2:54
2.	"No Class"	2:49
3.	"I'm So Bad (Baby I Don't Care)"	3:36
4.	"Over Your Shoulder"	3:37
5.	"Civil War"	3:20
6.	"Metropolis"	3:44
7.	"Overnight Sensation"	4:50
8.	"God Save the Queen"	3:32
9.	"Born to Raise Hell"	6:31
10.	"The Chase Is Better Than the Catch"	5:42
11.	"Stay Out of Jail"	3:33
12.	"Dead Men Tell No Tales"	2:45

Live at Brixton Academy Disc 2
No.	Title	Length
1.	"You Better Run"	6:48
2.	"Sacrifice"	5:49
3.	"Orgasmatron"	6:50
4.	"Going to Brazil"	2:36
5.	"Broken"	4:59
6.	"Damage Case"	3:52
7.	"Iron Fist"	3:16
8.	"Killed by Death"	7:26
9.	"Bomber"	4:16
10.	"Ace of Spades"	4:23
11.	"Overkill"	7:48

== Personnel ==
Adapted from the Live at Brixton Academy liner notes and from the AllMusic website.

Motörhead

- Lemmy – lead vocals, bass
- Phil Campbell – lead guitar
- Mikkey Dee – drums

Guests musicians;

- Whitfield Crane (ex-Ugly Kid Joe, ex-Medication), vocals on "Born to Raise Hell".
- Doro Pesch (ex-Warlock), vocals on "Born to Raise Hell".
- "Fast" Eddie Clarke (ex-Motörhead, ex-Fastway), guitar on "The Chase Is Better than the Catch" and "Overkill".
- Todd Campbell (Phil Campbell's son, S.K.W.A.D.), guitar on "Killed by Death".
- Paul Inder (Lemmy's son), guitar on "Killed By Death".
- Brian May (Queen), guitar on "Overkill".
- Ace (ex-Skunk Anansie), guitar on "Overkill".

== DVD Special Features ==
- Brixton concert specially mixed in Dolby 5.1
- Backstage interviews
- Six songs from the Wacken Festival 2001 in Germany
- Gallery of Motörhead members, past and present
- Lemmy and Phil playing "Ain't No Nice Guy" acoustic
- Obscure Releases gallery
- Multi Angle Footage during "I'm So Bad (Baby I Don't Care)"
- Moving Menus and Translations
- HTML pages of articles about the band

== Certifications ==
Region	Certification	Certified units/sales
Germany (BVMI)	Gold	25,000^{^}
^{^} Shipments figures based on certification alone.
