= Everything Louder than Everyone Else =

Live album by Motörhead
- Released: 9 March 1999
- Recorded: 21 May 1998
- Venues: The Docks, Hamburg, Germany
- Genres: Heavy metal, hard rock
- Length: 110:22
- Labels: SPV/Steamhammer (Europe); CMC International (US)
- Producer: Motörhead

Motörhead chronology
| Snake Bite Love (1998) | Everything Louder than Everyone Else (1999) | We Are Motörhead (2000) |

Everything Louder than Everyone Else is the sixth live album by the Rock n' Roll band Motörhead, released on 9 March 1999, on SPV/Steamhammer; their first live album with the label, but fourth album release. Recorded at The Docks nightclub in Hamburg, Germany, on 21 May 1998, Everything Louder than Everyone Else was produced 'overdub-free' in a two-disc format. It was first released as a digipak version, later followed by a slimline 2CD jewel-case run. At the start of the concert Lemmy announces, "We are Motörhead; and we’re gonna kick your ass."

== Recording ==
Vocalist/bassist Lemmy recalled making this during the Snake Bite Love tour, having decided to include an entire show on the release, which they hadn't done before because of the limitations of vinyl. The title refers to a remark by Ritchie Blackmore which is repeated by Ian Gillan of Deep Purple on that group's Made in Japan live album:

"..could we have everything louder than everything else?.."

Lemmy said he chose to record it in Hamburg, Germany, because:

"..the Germans have been such loyal fans of ours. They always rescued our ass when we were going down for the third time. They stuck with us, and we knew Hamburg would be a great audience. It's like Liverpool — a seafaring town, and you know where you are with a sailor!.."

== Release ==
In Joel McIver's 2011 book Overkill: The Untold Story of Motörhead, Lemmy is quoted as saying he believes the album is better than the classic 1981 live LP No Sleep 'til Hammersmith, stating:

"..it's a double, for starters, and this is a better band, I think. We function better as a trio. We get more money, for one thing — ha ha! — but you have to do better as a three-piece because people can hear the holes more easily.."

== Critical reception ==
Professional ratings
Review scores
| Source | Rating |
|---|---|
| AllMusic | 3/5 stars |
| Collector's Guide to Heavy Metal | 8/10 |
| The Encyclopedia of Popular Music | 2/5 stars |
| Rock Hard | 10/10 |

Andy Hinds of AllMusic writes:

"..mixed unbelievably loud and in-your-face, it captures Motörhead's overwhelming live power in all its toothy glory and reflects a veteran band working at the peak of its skill.."

== Track listing ==
CD 1
| No. | Title | Writer(s) | Original album | Length |
|---|---|---|---|---|
| 1. | "Iron Fist" | Kilmister, Eddie Clarke, Phil Taylor | 1982 ~ Iron Fist | 4:08 |
| 2. | "Stay Clean" | Kilmister, Clarke, Taylor | 1979 ~ Overkill | 2:48 |
| 3. | "On Your Feet or on Your Knees" | Kilmister, Michael Burston, Campbell, Dee | 1993 ~ Bastards | 3:20 |
| 4. | "Over Your Shoulder" | Kilmister, Burston, Campbell, Dee | 1995 ~ Sacrifice | 3:45 |
| 5. | "Civil War" | Kilmister, Campbell, Dee, Max Ax | 1996 ~ Overnight Sensation | 3:29 |
| 6. | "Burner" | Kilmister, Burston, Campbell, Dee | 1993 ~ Bastards | 3:23 |
| 7. | "Metropolis" | Kilmister, Clarke, Taylor | 1979 ~ Overkill | 4:00 |
| 8. | "Nothing Up My Sleeve" | Kilmister, Campbell, Burston, Pete Gill | 1986 ~ Orgasmatron | 3:41 |
| 9. | "I'm So Bad (Baby I Don't Care)" | Kilmister, Campbell, Burston, Taylor | 1991 ~ 1916 | 3:21 |
| 10. | "The Chase Is Better Than the Catch" | Kilmister, Clarke, Taylor | 1980 ~ Ace of Spades | 5:28 |
| 11. | "Take the Blame" | Kilmister, Campbell, Dee | 1998 ~ Snake Bite Love | 4:20 |
| 12. | "No Class" | Kilmister, Clarke, Taylor | 1979 ~ Overkill | 3:22 |
| 13. | "Overnight Sensation" | Kilmister, Campbell, Dee | 1996 ~ Overnight Sensation | 4:38 |
| 14. | "Sacrifice" | Kilmister, Burston, Campbell, Dee | 1995 ~ Sacrifice | 3:40 |

CD 2
| No. | Title | Writer(s) | Original album | Length |
|---|---|---|---|---|
| 1. | "Born to Raise Hell" | Kilmister | 1993 ~ Bastards | 5:41 |
| 2. | "Lost in the Ozone" | Kilmister, Burston, Campbell, Dee | 1993 ~ Bastards | 3:43 |
| 3. | "The One to Sing the Blues" | Kilmister, Campbell, Burston, Taylor | 1991 ~ 1916 | 3:25 |
| 4. | "Capricorn" | Kilmister, Clarke, Taylor | 1979 ~ Overkill | 4:58 |
| 5. | "Love for Sale" | Kilmister, Campbell, Dee | 1998 ~ Snake Bite Love | 5:04 |
| 6. | "Orgasmatron" | Kilmister, Campbell, Burston, Gill | 1986 ~ Orgasmatron | 6:36 |
| 7. | "Going to Brazil" | Kilmister, Campbell, Burston, Taylor | 1991 ~ 1916 | 2:52 |
| 8. | "Killed by Death" | Kilmister, Campbell, Burston, Gill | 1984 ~ No Remorse | 6:27 |
| 9. | "Bomber" | Kilmister, Clarke, Taylor | 1979 ~ Bomber | 5:50 |
| 10. | "Ace of Spades" | Kilmister, Clarke, Taylor | 1980 ~ Ace of Spades | 4:49 |
| 11. | "Overkill" | Kilmister, Clarke, Taylor | 1979 ~ Overkill | 7:34 |

== Personnel ==
- Lemmy – lead vocals, bass
- Phil Campbell – lead guitar
- Mikkey Dee – drums

Production

- GAGA Studio - live recording
- Charly Bauerfiend, Rainer Hansel - mixing at KARO Studios, Brackel, Germany
- Motörhead - producers
- Joe Petagno – Snaggletooth

== Charts ==
| Chart (1999) | Peak position |
|---|---|
| UK Independent Albums (Official Charts) | 45 |
| UK Rock & Metal Albums (Official Charts) | 13 |
