= Hellraiser: Best of the Epic Years =

Greatest hits album by Motörhead
- Released: 17 March 2003
- Recorded: 1990–1992
- Genre: Heavy metal
- Length: 60:11
- Label: Sony Music

Motörhead chronology
Tear Ya Down: The Rarities (2002)	Hellraiser: Best of the Epic Years (2003)	Stone Deaf Forever! (2003)

Professional ratings
Review scores
Source	Rating
AllMusic	2.5/5 stars
The Encyclopedia of Popular Music	4/5 stars

Hellraiser: Best of the Epic Years is a compilation album by the band Motörhead, released in 2003.

== Recording ==
Hellraiser: Best of the Epic Years is spanning the band's two years at Epic Records. The compilation includes songs from the albums 1916 and March ör Die, as well as two non-album tracks that had been on the single "The One to Sing the Blues".

== Track List ==
Tracks
No.	Title	Writer(s)	Original Release	Length
1.	"The One to Sing the Blues"	Phil Campbell, Michael Burston, Ian Kilmister, Phil Taylor	1991 ~ 1916
2.	"Shut You Down"	Campbell, Burston, Kilmister, Taylor	1991 ~ 1916
3.	"I Ain't No Nice Guy" (Feat. Ozzy Osbourne & Slash)	Kilmister	1992 ~ March ör Die
4.	"Hellraiser"	Ozzy Osbourne, Zakk Wylde, Kilmister	1992 ~ March ör Die
5.	"Asylum Choir"	Campbell, Burston, Kilmister	1992 ~ March ör Die
6.	"Bad Religion"	Campbell, Burston, Kilmister	1992 ~ March ör Die
7.	"Eagle Rock"	Campbell, Burston, Kilmister, Taylor	1990 ~ The One to Sing the Blues
8.	"You Better Run" (Feat. Slash)	Kilmister	1992 ~ March ör Die
9.	"Cat Scratch Fever"	Ted Nugent	1992 ~ March ör Die
10.	"March ör Die"	Kilmister	1992 ~ March ör Die
11.	"Angel City"	Kilmister	1991 ~ 1916
12.	"1916"	Kilmister	1991 ~ 1916
13.	"Make My Day"	Campbell, Burston, Kilmister, Taylor	1991 ~ 1916
14.	"Going to Brazil"	Campbell, Burston, Kilmister, Taylor	1991 ~ 1916
15.	"Dead Man's Hand"	Campbell, Burston, Kilmister, Taylor	1990 ~ The One to Sing the Blues
16.	"R.A.M.O.N.E.S."	Campbell, Burston, Kilmister, Taylor	1991 ~ 1916

== Personnel ==
- Lemmy – bass, vocals
- Würzel – lead guitar
- Phil "Wizzö / Zoom" Campbell – rhythm guitar
- Phil "Philthy Animal" Taylor – drums on "The One to Sing the Blues", "Shut You Down", "I Ain't No Nice Guy", "Eagle Rock", "Angel City", "Make My Day", "Going to Brazil", "Dead Man's Hand" & "R.A.M.O.N.E.S."
- Tommy Aldridge – drums on "Asylum Choir", "Bad Religion", "You Better Run", "Cat Sratch Fever" & "March ör Die"

with

- Mikkey Dee – drums on "Hellraiser"
- Slash – guitar solo on "I Ain't No Nice Guy" & additional guitar on "You Better Run"
- Ozzy Osbourne – additional vocals on "I Ain't No Nice Guy"

== Charts ==
Chart (2010)	Peak position
Finnish Albums (Suomen virallinen lista)	49
