= Under Cöver =

Compilation album of cover songs by Motörhead
- Released: 1 September 2017; 13 December 2017 (Japan)
- Recorded: 1992–2015
- Studio: Studio 606
- Genre: Hard rock
- Length: 41:56
- Label: WEA/Silver Lining Music

Motörhead chronology
| Clean Your Clock (2016) | Under Cöver (2017) | Louder Than Noise… Live in Berlin (2021) |

Under Cöver is a covers compilation album by the band Motörhead, posthumously released on 1 September 2017.

Professional ratings
Review scores
| Source | Rating |
|---|---|
| Blabbermouth.net | 7.5/10 stars |

== Track listing ==
CD
| No. | Title | Writer(s) | previously published | Length |
|---|---|---|---|---|
| 1. | "Breaking the Law" (Judas Priest cover) | Rob Halford, K.K. Downing and Glenn Tipton | 2008 ~ Hell Bent Forever: A Tribute to Judas Priest | 2:33 |
| 2. | "God Save the Queen" (Sex Pistols cover) | Glen Matlock, John Lydon, Paul Cook and Steve Jones | 2000 ~ We Are Motörhead | 3:19 |
| 3. | "Heroes" (David Bowie cover) | David Bowie and Brian Eno | Previously Unreleased | 4:36 |
| 4. | "Starstruck" (Rainbow cover) | Ritchie Blackmore and Ronnie James Dio | 2014 ~ Ronnie James Dio: This Is Your Life | 4:06 |
| 5. | "Cat Scratch Fever" (Ted Nugent cover) | Ted Nugent | 1992 ~ March ör Die | 3:54 |
| 6. | "Jumpin' Jack Flash" (The Rolling Stones cover) | Mick Jagger, Keith Richards and Bill Wyman | 1993 ~ Bastards (2001 Reissue) | 3:19 |
| 7. | "Sympathy for the Devil" (The Rolling Stones cover) | Mick Jagger and Keith Richards | 2015 ~ Bad Magic | 5:35 |
| 8. | "Hellraiser" | Ozzy Osbourne, Zakk Wylde and Lemmy Kilmister | 1992 ~ March ör Die | 4:32 |
| 9. | "Rockaway Beach" (Ramones cover) | Dee Dee Ramone | Previously Unreleased | 2:16 |
| 10. | "Shoot 'Em Down" (Twisted Sister cover) | Dee Snider | 2001 ~ Twisted Forever: A Tribute to the Legendary Twisted Sister | 3:53 |
| 11. | "Whiplash" (Metallica cover) | James Hetfield and Lars Ulrich | 2004 ~ Metallic Attack: The Ultimate Tribute / Kiss of Death bonus track | 3:49 |

Japanese bonus track
| No. | Title | Writer(s) | Previously Published | Length |
|---|---|---|---|---|
| 12. | "Motörhead" (2007 Version) (Hawkwind Cover) | Lemmy Kilmister | 2007 ~ Previously unreleased | 3:18 |

NOTES: -

- The Japanese edition alone featured live performances of "Cat Scratch Fever" & "Hellraiser".
- 2007 version of "Motörhead" was on CD but used for the music rhythm game Guitar Hero III: Legends of Rock which was released in 2007 (Motörhead DLC in 2008)
- ""Heroes"" was recorded during the band's 2015 Bad Magic album sessions and was one of the final songs recorded by the band before Lemmy died in 2015. "Heroes" would later be rereleased as a part of Bad Magic: Seriously Bad Magic, a reissue of Bad Magic scheduled for release on 24 February 2023.

== Personnel ==
=== Motörhead ===
- Lemmy – bass, lead vocals
- Phil "Zööm" Campbell – guitars, backing vocals
- Michael "Würzel" Burston – lead guitar, backing vocals on track 5 and 8
- Mikkey Dee – drums

=== Guest musicians ===
- Biff Byford – lead vocals on track 4
- Tommy Aldridge – drums on track 5

=== Production ===
- Cameron Webb – producer on tracks 1, 3, 4 and 7 and mixing on track 9
- Bob Kulick and Bruce Bouillet – producers on tracks 2, 6, 10 and 11
- Peter Solley – producer on track 5
- Billy Sherwood – producer on track 8

== Charts ==
| Chart (2017) | Peak position |
|---|---|
| Australian Albums (ARIA) | 57 |
| Austrian Albums (Ö3 Austria) | 14 |
| Belgian Albums (Ultratop Flanders) | 32 |
| Belgian Albums (Ultratop Wallonia) | 49 |
| Czech Albums (ČNS IFPI) | 21 |
| Dutch Albums (Album Top 100) | 87 |
| Finnish Albums (Suomen virallinen lista) | 13 |
| French Albums (SNEP) | 26 |
| German Albums (Offizielle Top 100) | 4 |
| Hungarian Albums (MAHASZ) | 29 |
| Italian Albums (FIMI) | 62 |
| Polish Albums (ZPAV) | 45 |
| Scottish Albums (Official Charts) | 11 |
| Spanish Albums (Promusicae) | 24 |
| Swedish Albums (Sverigetopplistan) | 11 |
| Swiss Albums (Schweizer Hitparade) | 7 |
| UK Albums (Official Charts) | 19 |
| UK Rock & Metal Albums (Official Charts) | 2 |
| UK Independent Albums (Official Charts) | 5 |
| US Independent Albums (Billboard) | 44 |
| US Indie Store Album Sales (Billboard) | 17 |
