= BBC Live & In-Session =

Live album by Motörhead
- Released: 20 September 2005
- Recorded: 18 September 1978 – 9 May 1986
- Venue: Paris Theatre, London, UK
- Studio: BBC Maida Vale Studio 4, London, UK
- Genre: Heavy metal
- Length: 82:51
- Label: Sanctuary
- Producer: Bob Sargeant, John Sparrow
- Compiler: Mike Stevenson

Motörhead chronology
Inferno (2004)	BBC Live & In-Session (2005)	Kiss of Death (2006)

Professional ratings
Review scores
Source	Rating
AllMusic	3.5/5 stars

BBC Live & In-Session is a live album by the band Motörhead, released in 2005, which contains the band's appearances on the BBC Radio 1 program from 1978 to 1986 and a concert recording from the Paris Theatre, London in 1979. It is the second live album in North America and certain territories under Sanctuary Records and their subsidiary Metal-Is.

== Track listing ==
=== Disc one ===
John Peel In-Session (Aired 25 September 1978, recorded 18 September 1978)
No.	Title	Writer(s)	Original Release	Length
1.	"Keep Us on the Road"	"Lemmy" Kilmister, "Fast" Eddie Clarke, Phil "Philthy Animal" Taylor	1977 ~ Motörhead	5:18
2.	"Louie Louie"	Richard Berry	1978 ~ "Louie Louie"	2:44
3.	"I'll Be Your Sister"	Kilmister, Clarke, Taylor	1979 ~ Overkill	3:14
4.	"Tear Ya Down"	Kilmister, Clarke, Taylor	1979 ~ Overkill	2:38

In-Concert - Live From Paris Theatre, London (16 May 1979)
No.	Title	Writer(s)	Original Release	Length
5.	"Stay Clean"	Kilmister, Clarke, Taylor	1979 ~ Overkill	3:14
6.	"No Class"	Kilmister, Clarke, Taylor	1979 ~ Overkill	2:46
7.	"White Line Fever"	Kilmister, Clarke, Taylor	1977 ~ Motörhead	2:38
8.	"I'll Be Your Sister"	Kilmister, Clarke, Taylor	1979 ~ Overkill	3:28
9.	"Too Late, Too Late"	Kilmister, Clarke, Taylor	1979 ~ "Overkill" (Single)	3:27
10.	"(I Won't) Pay Your Price"	Kilmister, Clarke, Taylor	1979 ~ Overkill	3:16
11.	"Capricorn"	Kilmister, Clarke, Taylor	1979 ~ Overkill	4:14
12.	"Limb From Limb"	Kilmister, Clarke, Taylor	1979 ~ Overkill	5:28

=== Disc two ===
David Jensen Show (Aired 6 October 1981, recorded 1 October 1981)
No.	Title	Writer(s)	Original Release	Length
1.	"Fast and Loose"	Kilmister, Clarke, Taylor	1980 ~ Ace of Spades	4:19
2.	"Live to Win"	Kilmister, Clarke, Taylor	1980 ~ Ace of Spades	3:34
3.	"White Line Fever"	Kilmister, Clarke, Taylor	1977 ~ Motörhead	2:22
4.	"Like a Nightmare"	Kilmister, Clarke, Taylor	1979 ~ "No Class"	4:11
5.	"Bite the Bullet" / "The Chase Is Better Than the Catch"	Kilmister, Clarke, Taylor	1980 ~ Ace of Spades	6:06

Friday Rock Show (Aired 16 August 1986, recorded 9 May 1986)
No.	Title	Writer(s)	Original Release	Length
6.	"Killed by Death"	Kilmister, Phil Campbell, Michael "Würzel" Burston, Pete Gill	1984 ~ No Remorse	5:23
7.	"Orgasmatron"	Kilmister, Campbell, Burston, Gill	1986 ~ Orgasmatron	5:06
8.	"Doctor Rock"	Kilmister, Campbell, Burston, Gill	1986 ~ Orgasmatron	3:25
9.	"Deaf Forever"	Kilmister, Campbell, Burston, Gill	1986 ~ Orgasmatron	4:19
10.	"Orgasmatron" (Spoken Words)	Kilmister		1:30

== Personnel ==
- Lemmy – lead vocals, bass - all tracks
- "Fast" Eddie Clarke – guitar, backing vocals - all tracks disk 1 & disk 2 tracks 1–5
- Phil "Philthy Animal" Taylor – drums - all tracks disk 1 & disk 2 tracks 1–5
- Phil Campbell – rhythm guitar & lead guitar, backing vocals - disk 2 tracks 6–10
- Michael "Würzel" Burston – rhythm guitar & lead guitar, backing vocals - disk 2 tracks 6–10
- Pete Gill – drums - disk 2 tracks 6–10

Production

- Bob Sargeant - producer (tracks 1-1 to 1-4)
- Dave Dade - engineer (tracks 1-1 to 1-4)
- John Sparrow - producer (tracks 2-1 to 2-5)
- Mick Stevenson - compiler
- Nick Watson - mastering
- Jon Richards, Steve Hammonds - project coordinators
- Curt Evans - design
- Malcolm Dome - liner notes
