= '92 Tour EP =

EP by Motörhead
- Released: 2 November 1992
- Recorded: 1990, 1991 & 1992
- Length: 13:13
- Label: WTG Records
- Producer: Billy Sherwood, Peter Solley, Ed Stasium

Motörhead chronology
March ör Die (1992)	'92 Tour EP (1992)	The Best of Motörhead (1993)

'92 Tour EP is the final EP by the band Motörhead. Released in 1992 on WTG Records, it would represent their final release with the label.

== Recording ==
It is a mixture of the sessions done in 1990, 1991 and 1992 for their 1916 and March ör Die albums. It covers the work Lemmy did with Ozzy Osbourne, on each other's bands at the time, as well as it being the end of the old era line up, with Philthy on drums on the B-Side, and the beginning of the new era, with Mikkey Dee on drums on the A-Side. It plays the album tracks in reverse order of their original release.

== Release ==
Issued in 12" vinyl and CD 'jewel slim-case' formats. Tracks one and two are taken from the March or Die album, tracks three and four are taken from the 1916 album.

Epic released a 12" Promo version in the U.S. with "Hellraiser" on the A-side and "You Better Run" on the B-side.

== Track listing ==
=== 12" LP & CD ===
Side A
No.	Title	Writer(s)	Original release	Length
1.	"Hellraiser"	Ozzy Osbourne, Zakk Wylde, Kilmister	1992 ~ March ör Die	4:36
2.	"You Better Run"	Kilmister	1992 ~ March ör Die	4:51

Side B
No.	Title	Writer(s)	Original release	Length
3.	"Going to Brazil"	Kilmister, Burston, Campbell, Taylor	1991 ~ 1916	2:29
4.	"R.A.M.O.N.E.S."	Kilmister, Burston, Campbell, Taylor	1991 ~ 1916	1:27

== Personnel ==
- Lemmy – bass, vocals
- Michael "Würzel" Burston – lead guitar
- Phil "Zööm" Campbell – rhythm guitar
- Mikkey Dee – drums tracks 1
- Tommy Aldridge – drums track 2
- Phil "Philthy Animal" Taylor – drums tracks 3 & 4

=== Production ===
- Producer – Ed Stassium – producer ("Going to Brazil")
- Billy Sherwood – producer ("Hellraiser")
- Peter Solley – producer ("Hellraiser")
- Paul Hemingson – engineer ("Going to Brazil")
- Tom Fletcher – engineer ("Hellraiser")
- Casey McMackin – engineer ("Hellraiser")
- Steve Hall – mastering
