= 1916 Live...Everything Louder than Everything Else =

Motörhead Live: Everything Löuder than Everything Else

Video by Motörhead
- Released: 15 July 1991
- Recorded: 11 March 1991
- Venue: Deutsches Museum in Munich, Germany
- Genre: Heavy metal
- Length: 76:00
- Label: Sony
- Producer: Motörhead

Motörhead chronology
| Deaf Not Blind (1986) | Motörhead Live: Everything Löuder than Everything Else (1991) | 25 & Alive Boneshaker (2001) |

Professional ratings
Review scores
| Source | Rating |
|---|---|
| AllMusic | 3/5 stars |

Motörhead Live: Everything Löuder than Everything Else is a 1991 live video featuring Motörhead's performance recorded at the Deutsches Museum in Munich, Germany on 11 March 1991. Most of the material was recorded in grainy b/w, as was popular at the time. However, some scenes were recorded in colour, or have some colour in them.

The initial UK release has a sticker on the front, inviting fans to send off for a free poster.

== Track listing ==
| No. | Title | Album | Length |
|---|---|---|---|
| 1. | "Metropolis" | Overkill |
| 2. | "I'm So Bad (Baby I Don't Care)" | 1916 |
| 3. | "Going to Brazil" | 1916 |
| 4. | "Traitor" | Rock 'N' Roll |
| 5. | "No Voices in The Sky" | 1916 |
| 6. | "Just 'Cos You Got the Power" | Eat the Rich |
| 7. | "Angel City" | 1916 |
| 8. | "Love Me Forever" | 1916 |
| 9. | "R.A.M.O.N.E.S." | 1916 |
| 10. | "Orgasmatron" | Orgasmatron |
| 11. | "Killed by Death" | No Remorse |
| 12. | "Ace of Spades" | Ace of Spades |

== Credits ==
- Lemmy – bass guitar, vocals
- Phil "Wizzo" Campbell – guitar
- Michael "Würzel" Burston – guitar
- Phil "Philthy Animal" Taylor – drums
