= Garry Bowler =

British musician

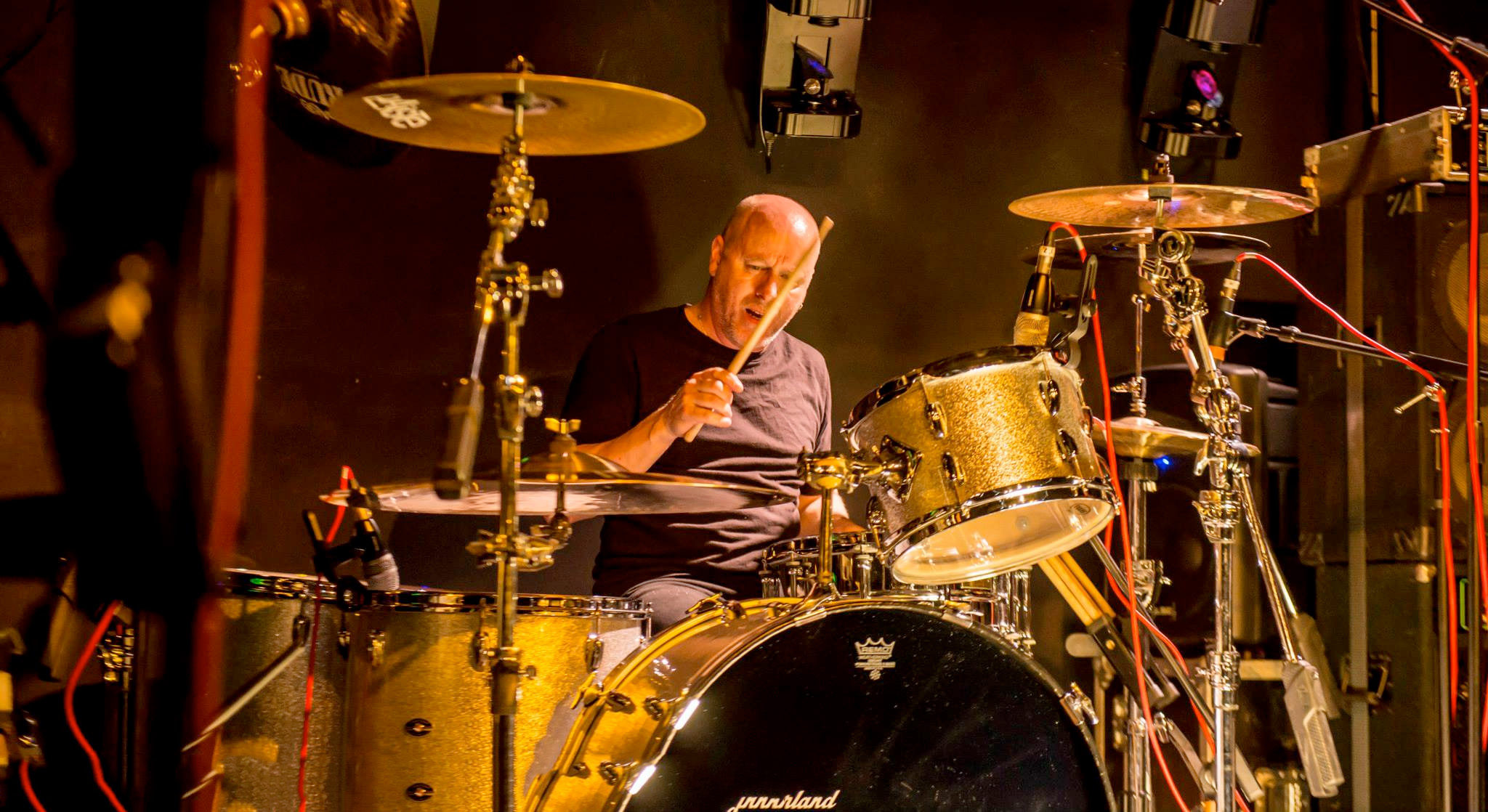
Garry Bowler playing his vintage Slingerland drums

Garry "Jim" Bowler, also known as "Magpie" (born 6 February 1962, Manchester, England), is an English drummer and session musician, who has worked with musicians including Würzel (Motörhead), Dennis Stratton (Iron Maiden), Alan Davey (Hawkwind) and Bernie Tormé (Gillan/Ozzy Osbourne).

== Biography ==
Bowler has worked with artistes as diverse as Hostage, Rose of Victory (ex-Blitz), replacing Simon Wright in Tora Tora ('80s UK rock band), Mournblade, Mutant, Motörhead, Bernie Tormé, Würzel (Motörhead), Larry Wallis (Pink Fairies), Dennis Stratton (Iron Maiden), The High Priests of Hell, Global Noise Attack, Medicine Hat, Another Storm (feat. Keith Winter – ex Shakatak), the Kelly Lee Band, Redsoxx and many others.

In 1992, Bowler was asked to join Motörhead to replace drummer Phil "Philthy Animal" Taylor, after working on some material for the March ör Die album. Bowler got to know Würzel when Mournblade supported Motörhead in 1989. In December 1991, Bowler received a call from Würzel to join him at a rehearsal session in London with Phil Campbell. Bowler used Phil Taylor's drum kit and they worked on two or three ideas and recorded them for Lemmy, who was in LA. One of the demos became the track "Stand" from Motörhead's 1992 March ör Die album. In the event Mikkey Dee played on a couple of the album tracks and joined the band.

Bowler is a constant live performer (UK and International) as well as a recording artiste, recording material for TV and radio such as Bob Harris's opening jingle (Radio 2) and music for Ewan McGregor & Charley Boorman's Long Way Round which included music from the highly acclaimed "The Pendell Guitar Project" with Stephen Loveday. He has also appeared in numerous music videos and live DVDs, on TV programmes for ITV, SKY and live radio sessions for Radio 1, 2 and Virgin Radio. Bowler is currently playing live with Medicine Hat, Another Storm, Dirty Lions, Mournblade, Satan's Empire and Dennis Stratton.

== Album discography ==
Mournblade

- Live Fast Die Young

Medicine Hat

- Bonedry
- Medicine Hat Live
- From Nowhere To Here

Pendell Guitar Project (with Stephen Loveday)

- various tracks used on Long Way Round series

Kelly Lee

- I Can Dream

Joker

- Joker

Dirty Lions

- RAW
- Last Time

Mournblade

- Live & Loud – Studio Outtakes
- Live from the 2012 Heavy Metal Maniacs Festival

Satan's Empire

- Rising
- Hail The Empire

== Other recorded work ==
Rose of Victory

- "Suffragette City" (single)

Medicine Hat

- "C'Mon Here" (single/EP)
- "I Still Bleed" (single/EP)
- "Old Time Rock and Roll" (single/EP)
- "Too Far Gone" (single/EP)

Various artists

- Shooting From The Hip (compilation album feat. Mournblade)

Guitarist Magazine

- "Country Boy" (exclusive Medicine Hat track)

Powerplay Magazine

- "Sweet Mama" (Medicine Hat)

Classic Rock Magazine

- "One of These Days" (Medicine Hat)

Radio 2

- Bob Harris (opening jingle)

Classic Rock Magazine - The Blues

- 2015 issue 21 - Dirty Lions cover mount CD track - "Bad Day"

Motorhead

- Demo recordings for the March Or Die album inc. "Stand" and "Jack The Ripper"

Wurzel

- Spoof of Motorhead's "Ace Of Spades" - "Waste Of Space"

Magpie

- Dancing With The Devil - Solo Single release featuring Neil Murray (bass), Frankie Aiello (vocals), David Stone (keyboards) and Bernie Torm'e (Guitar).
