= Don't Let Daddy Kiss Me =

Single by Motörhead

from the album Bastards
- B-side: "Born to Raise Hell/Death or Glory"
- Released: 1993
- Recorded: 1993
- Studio: A & M Studios; Prime Time Studios; Hollywood, California, US
- Genre: Rock
- Length: 4:05
- Label: Sony
- Songwriter: Lemmy
- Producer: Howard Benson

Motörhead singles chronology
"Hellraiser" (1992)	"Don't Let Daddy Kiss Me" (1993)	"Born to Raise Hell" (1994)

"Don't Let Daddy Kiss Me" is a song by the British rock band Motörhead. It was written by Lemmy and released as a single in 1993. The song is covered with "Born to Raise Hell", which was released as a separate single, and "Death or Glory". All three songs are from the Bastards album.

The song is about child sexual abuse, and was one of Lemmy's favourites. Written three years before being recorded, Lemmy offered it to Lita Ford and Joan Jett, among others and although much enthusiasm was received, he ended up recording it himself.

== Track listing ==
1. "Don't Let Daddy Kiss Me" (Lemmy)
2. "Born to Raise Hell" (Lemmy)
3. "Death or Glory" (Lemmy, Würzel, Phil Campbell, Mikkey Dee)

== Personnel ==
- Würzel - Guitar
- Phil "Wizzo" Campbell - Guitar
- Lemmy - Bass, vocals
- Mikkey Dee - Drums
