= March or Die =

March or Die may refer to:

- March ör Die, a Motörhead album, also the album's title track name
- March or Die (film), a 1977 film directed by Dick Richards, starring Gene Hackman, Terence Hill, Catherine Deneuve and Ian Holm
