= The Best of Motörhead (album) =

Greatest hits album by Motörhead
- Released: 6 July 1993
- Genre: Heavy metal; speed metal
- Length: 69:47
- Label: Roadrunner

Motörhead chronology
| '92 Tour EP (1992) | The Best of Motörhead (1993) | Bastards (1993) |

Professional ratings
Review scores
| Source | Rating |
|---|---|
| AllMusic | 4.0/5 stars |
| Robert Christgau | (2-star Honorable Mention) |
| The Encyclopedia of Popular Music | 4/5 stars |
| Spin Alternative Record Guide | 7/10 |

The Best of Motörhead is a compilation album by the band Motörhead, released in July 1993. It includes 20 of their most popular songs.

== Track listing ==
Track List
| No. | Title | Original release | Length |
|---|---|---|---|
| 1. | "Killed by Death" | No Remorse | 4:39 |
| 2. | "Ace of Spades" | Ace of Spades | 2:46 |
| 3. | "Motörhead" (Live in 1981) | No Sleep 'til Hammersmith | 3:55 |
| 4. | "Iron Fist" | Iron Fist | 2:53 |
| 5. | "Overkill" | Overkill | 5:10 |
| 6. | "Eat the Rich" | Rock 'N' Roll | 3:40 |
| 7. | "Love Me Like a Reptile" | Ace of Spades | 3:21 |
| 8. | "(We Are) The Road Crew" (Live in 1981) | No Sleep 'til Hammersmith | 3:30 |
| 9. | "Rock 'N' Roll" | Rock 'N' Roll | 3:48 |
| 10. | "The Hammer" | Ace of Spades | 2:45 |
| 11. | "Damage Case" | Overkill | 3:01 |
| 12. | "The Chase Is Better Than the Catch" | Ace of Spades | 4:15 |
| 13. | "Stone Deaf in the U.S.A." | Rock 'N' Roll | 3:34 |
| 14. | "No Class" | Overkill | 2:37 |
| 15. | "Bomber" (Live in 1981) | No Sleep 'til Hammersmith | 3:11 |
| 16. | "Doctor Rock" | Orgasmatron | 3:36 |
| 17. | "Dead Men Tell No Tales" | Bomber | 3:03 |
| 18. | "Built for Speed" (Live in 1988) | Nö Sleep at All | 4:53 |
| 19. | "Over the Top" | Bomber | 3:14 |
| 20. | "Orgasmatron" | Orgasmatron | 5:25 |
