= The Best of Motörhead =

The Best of Motörhead may refer to:

- The Best of Motörhead (video), a 2002 compilation DVD by Motörhead
- The Best of Motörhead (album), a 1993 compilation album by Motörhead

== See also ==
- The Best Of (Motörhead album), 2000
