= Born to Raise Hell (Motörhead song) =

Single by Motörhead featuring Ice-T and Whitfield Crane

from the album Bastards and Airheads (Original Soundtrack)
- B-side: "Born to Raise Hell" (radio edit); "Born to Raise Hell" (Dust Brothers Live and Funky Mix)
- Released: October 1994 (EU); 28 November 1994 (UK)
- Recorded: Album version recorded in 1993 at A&M Studios; Prime Time Studios; Hollywood, California
- Genre: Heavy metal; hard rock
- Length: 4:56
- Songwriter: Lemmy
- Producer: Howard Benson

Motörhead singles chronology
"Don't Let Daddy Kiss Me" (1993)	"Born to Raise Hell" (1994)	"God Save the Queen" (2000)

Ice-T singles chronology
"Gotta Lotta Love" (1994)	"Born to Raise Hell" (1994)	"I Must Stand" (1996)

Picture disc
- 12" picture disc version

"Born to Raise Hell" is a song by the British rock band Motörhead. Originally written by Lemmy Kilmister for the German band Skew Siskin, it plays over the opening credits of the 1994 film Airheads in which Lemmy makes a cameo appearance.

The song was released as a single in October 1994, it is a re-recorded of the original featuring Ice-T and Ugly Kid Joe lead singer Whitfield Crane. The single features a radio edit, the re-recorded version and the Dust Brothers Live and Funky Mix. A special 12" vinyl picture disc pressing was made, using the same picture as the CD single release.

This version was recorded in addition to the previous recordings of "Hellraiser" and "Hell on Earth", as a last minute job to play over the end credits of the Hellraiser III: Hell on Earth film, although it didn't appear on the film's original soundtrack album.

At 2016's Bloodstock Open Air Festival, Phil Campbell & The Bastard Sons (formerly The Phil Campbell All Starr Band) covered the track with guest vocals from Twisted Sister's Dee Snider as a tribute to Lemmy.

A small excerpt was used in the 2019 film Fighting with My Family.

== Single track listing ==
Song written by Lemmy.

1. "Born to Raise Hell" (Radio Edit) – 4:02
2. "Born to Raise Hell" (Soundtrack re-recorded Version) – 4:56
3. "Born to Raise Hell" (Dust Brothers Live and Funky Mix) – 3:52

== Personnel ==
Motörhead

- Lemmy – lead vocals, bass
- Phil "Wizzö" Campbell – guitars
- Würzel – guitars
- Mikkey Dee – drums

Guest musicians

- Ice-T and Whitfield Crane – vocals
- Michael Monroe – backing vocals
