= Lag (company) =

French music company

Lâg
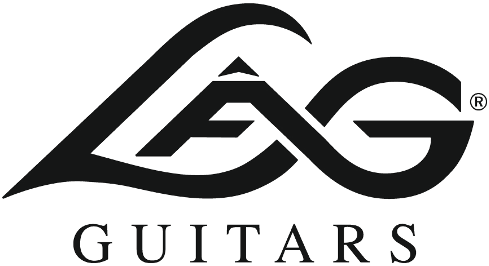
- Industry: Musical Instruments
- Founded: 1980; 46 years ago
- Founder: Michel Lâg-Chavarria
- Headquarters: Bédarieux, France
- Products: Acoustic guitars
- Website: lagguitars.com

Lâg Guitars is a French music company founded in the Occitania region of France by luthier Michel Lâg-Chavarria in 1980. Lâg produces various acoustic guitars, smart guitars and ukuleles. They are designed in the south of France.

Notable players of Lâg guitars include Phil Campbell of Motörhead and Charles Hedger of Cradle of Filth.

== Bibliography ==
- Blue Book of Electric Guitars By Zachary R. Fjestad, S. P. Fjestad
