= Old Lions Still Roar =

2019 studio album by Phil Campbell

Studio album by Phil Campbell
- Released: 25 October 2019
- Recorded: 2016–2019
- Length: 41:26
- Label: Nuclear Blast
- Producer: Todd Campbell

Phil Campbell chronology
The Age of Absurdity (2018)	Old Lions Still Roar (2019)

Professional ratings
Review scores
Source	Rating
Classic Rock	4/5 stars
Blabbermouth	8/10

Old Lions Still Roar is the debut and only solo studio album by the Welsh guitarist Phil Campbell (second if counting albums by his band the Bastard Sons). It was released on 25 October 2019 on Nuclear Blast.

== Development ==
Since 1999, long-time Motörhead guitarist Phil Campbell had been planning a solo album. However, this never came about due to the tight schedule of his former band. Only when Motörhead was dissolved after the death of singer Lemmy Kilmister did Campbell find the time to put his ideas into practice. At the beginning of the 2010s he had set up a recording studio in his house and collected riffs and licks over the years. Around 2016, the recordings began, now without time pressure. Phil Campbell insisted on writing ten different-sounding songs that have nothing to do with his old band Motörhead.

Campbell then sent the finished song ideas to various musicians whom he wanted to have as guests on his album. He received many pledges. In addition to his three sons, who join him in the band Phil Campbell and the Bastard Sons, the album features many stars of the metal and hard rock scene such as Rob Halford of Judas Priest, Alice Cooper, Dee Snider of Twisted Sister, Danko Jones or Whitfield Crane of Ugly Kid Joe, and more diverse musicians like Mark King of Level 42. Campbell's lyrics have been performed by various singers. Leon Stanford interviewed Campbell and wrote the song "Rocking Chair" about his early days in the music business. Dee Snider wrote "These Old Boots" about all the old musicians involved in the project who are still in business after many years.

The album was produced by Todd Campbell, while Soren Anderson mixed the album. The album title goes back to one of Phil Campbell's sons, who suggested "Old Lions Still Roar" as a song title. According to Phil Campbell, the title would fit perfectly with the solo album, as "many old bags" would be there. An animated music video was released for the song "These Old Boots". The song "Swing It" appeared as a lyric video.

== Track listing ==
1. "Rocking Chair" (Phil Campbell, Leon Stanford) – 4:24
2. "Straight Up" (Campbell, Rob Halford) – 4:28
3. "Faith in Fire" (Campbell, Ben Ward) – 3:53
4. "Swing It" (Campbell, Chuck Garric) – 3:51
5. "Left for Dead" (Campbell, Nev MacDonald) – 5:23
6. "Walk the Talk" (Campbell, Danko Jones, Nick Oliveri) – 3:57
7. "These Old Boots" (Campbell, Dee Snider) – 5:05
8. "Dancing Dogs (Love Survives)" (Campbell, Whitfield Crane, Lee Richards) – 3:26
9. "Dead Roses" (Campbell, Benji Webbe) – 4:00
10. "Tears from a Glass Eye" (Campbell) – 2:41

== Personnel ==
- Tim Atkinson – bass guitar on "Faith in Fire"
- Dane Campbell – drums on "Straight Up", "Swing It", "Left for Dead" and "Dancing Dogs (Love Survives)"
- Phil Campbell – guitars, bass guitar on "These Old Boots", piano on "Rocking Chair", "Swing It", "Left for Dead", "Dead Roses" and "Tears from a Glass Eye", backing vocals on "These Old Boots"
- Todd Campbell – acoustic guitar on "Rocking Chair", additional guitar on "These Old Boots"
- Tyla Campbell – bass guitar on "Straight Up" and "Dancing Dogs (Love Survives)", acoustic guitar on "Left for Dead"
- Alice Cooper – vocals on "Swing It"
- Whitfield Crane – vocals on "Dancing Dogs (Love Survives)"
- Will Davies – bass guitar on "Rocking Chair" and "Dead Roses"
- Chris Fehn – drums on "These Old Boots"
- Chuck Garric – bass guitar and backing vocals on "Swing It"
- Robyn Griffith – drums on "Faith in Fire"
- Rob Halford – vocals on "Straight Up"
- Danko Jones – vocals on "Walk the Talk"
- Mark King – bass guitar on "Left for Dead"
- Ray Luzier – drums on "Walk the Talk"
- Nev MacDonald – vocals on "Left for Dead"
- Mick Mars – guitar on "These Old Boots"
- Nick Oliveri – vocals and bass guitar on "Walk the Talk"
- Danny Owen – keyboards on "Left for Dead"
- Joe Satriani – all other instruments on "Tears from a Glass Eye"
- Dee Snider – vocals on "These Old Boots"
- Matt Sorum – drums on "Dead Roses"
- Leon Stanford – vocals on "Rocking Chair"
- Ben Ward – vocals on "Faith in Fire"
- Benji Webbe – vocals on "Dead Roses"

== Charts ==
Chart (2019)	Peak position
German Albums (Offizielle Top 100)	43
Scottish Albums (OCC)	25
Swiss Albums (Schweizer Hitparade)	34
UK Albums (OCC)	75
UK Independent Albums (OCC)	9
UK Rock & Metal Albums (OCC)	3
