= In the Beginning (Cro-Mags album) =

Studio album by Cro-Mags
- Released: June 19, 2020
- Genre: Hardcore punk; crossover thrash
- Length: 38:30
- Label: Mission Two Entertainment
- Producer: Arthur Rizk, Harley Flanagan

Cro-Mags chronology
| Revenge (2000) | In the Beginning (2020) |

Professional ratings
Review scores
| Source | Rating |
|---|---|
| Exclaim! | 8/10 |

In the Beginning is the sixth studio album by the New York hardcore band Cro-Mags. It was released on June 19, 2020 and marks the band's first album in two decades.

== Reception ==
Exclaim! praised the album and spoke of the band's legacy saying "a real treat to see them reaffirm that legacy, proving that they haven't gotten too old for this shit, nor have they lost any of their fire." Punknews.org awarded the album 4.5 stars (out of a possible 5) and called the album "beautiful art."

== Track listing ==
All songs written by Harley Flanagan.

| No. | Title | Length |
|---|---|---|
| 1. | "Don't Give In" | 3:01 |
| 2. | "Drag You Under" | 1:33 |
| 3. | "No One's Victim" | 2:40 |
| 4. | "From the Grave" | 2:19 |
| 5. | "No One's Coming" | 4:39 |
| 6. | "PTSD" | 3:31 |
| 7. | "The Final Test" | 3:24 |
| 8. | "One Bad Decision" | 2:13 |
| 9. | "Two Hours" | 2:25 |
| 10. | "Don't Talk About It" | 2:09 |
| 11. | "Between Wars" | 5:50 |
| 12. | "No Turning Back" | 2:20 |
| 13. | "There Was a Time" | 2:26 |

== Personnel ==
Personnel per booklet.

Cro-Mags

- Harley Flanagan – bass, lead vocals
- Rocky George – lead guitar, backing vocals
- Gabby Abularach – rhythm guitar
- Garry Sullivan – drums

Additional musicians

- Carlos "Lamont" Cooper – cello
- Phil Campbell – rhythm guitar
- Reilly – backing vocals
- Harley Karsten Flanagan – backing vocals
- Jonah Odin Flanagan – backing vocals

Production

- Harley Flanagan – production
- John Ferrara – recording
- Brian Joya – recording
- Arthur Rizk – production, mastering, mixing
- Todd Campbell – assistant engineer
- Brandon Chase – design, layout
- Laura Lee Flanagan – photography
- Balazs Szabo – photography
- Brooke Smith-Lubensky – photography
- Steve Butcher – photography
