= Deaf Forever =

Single by Motörhead

from the album Orgasmatron
- B-side: On the Road/Steal Your Face (live) [12" only]
- Released: June 1986
- Recorded: 1986; Master Rock Studios, London, UK
- Genre: Heavy metal
- Length: 4:25
- Label: GWR
- Songwriters: Phil Campbell; Würzel; Lemmy; Pete Gill
- Producers: Bill Laswell; Vic Maile

Motörhead singles chronology
"Killed by Death" (1984)	"Deaf Forever" (1986)	"Eat the Rich" (1987)

"Deaf Forever" is a song by the English heavy metal band Motörhead, released in 1986 in 7" and 12" vinyl pressings. It is covered with B-sides, "On the Road (live)", and on the 12" vinyl, a bonus (new) track, "Steal Your Face (live)". The title song is taken from the Orgasmatron album and the sleeve artwork was created by Joe Petagno. "Deaf Forever" reached number 67 on the UK Singles Chart.

On 20 June 1986 Lemmy was interviewed by Chris Tetley on BBC Radio 1's 'The Friday Rock Show', "Deaf Forever", "Doctor Rock" and "Nothing Up My Sleeve" were played. On 9 August 1986, Lemmy and Würzel were interviewed by Andy Kershaw on BBC Radio 1's 'Saturday Live' show, "Deaf Forever" and "Orgasmatron" were played.

The Dutch release of the 12" single features the same tracks as the UK edition but is a picture disc, displaying a colour photograph of the band.

The song was featured in the soundtrack to the film, Urban Legend.

== Track listing ==
All tracks written by Lemmy, Würzel, Phil Campbell and Pete Gill

=== 7" ===
1. "Deaf Forever"
2. "On the Road (live)"

=== 12" ===
1. "Deaf Forever"
2. "On the Road (live)"
3. "Steal Your Face (live)"

== Original vinyl releases ==
Original vinyl releases of this single contained a post card with a competition to win a Sony Discman and Motörhead's new CD album "Orgasmatron". The questions were:

1. Which member of Motörhead wears a strapless bra underneath his stage clothes?
2. Which member of Motörhead has two adorable little bunnies called Mopsy and Garfunkle?
3. Do you think there is a valid place for Motörhead to occupy in today's urban military industrial wasteland? True or false?
4. Do you feel that Motörhead say one thing one minute and out the other? (specify inside leg measurement)

The postcards were to be sent to GWR, the record label involved in the single's release.

== Personnel ==
Motörhead

- Lemmy – lead vocals, bass
- Phil "Wizzö" Campbell – guitars
- Würzel – guitars
- Pete Gill – drums

Production

- "Deaf Forever" produced by – Bill Laswell in association with Jason Corsaro
- "On the Road" produced – Vic Maile, mixed by Steve Kinkoff
