= The One to Sing the Blues =

Single by Motörhead

from the album 1916
- B-side: "Dead Man's Hand"
- Released: 24 December 1990
- Recorded: 1990
- Genre: Heavy metal; hard rock; speed metal
- Length: 3:07
- Label: Epic
- Songwriters: Phil Campbell; Würzel; Lemmy; Phil Taylor
- Producer: Peter Solley

Motörhead singles chronology
"Ace of Spades (live)" (1988)	"The One to Sing the Blues" (1990)	"Hellraiser" (1992)

Alternative cover
- Shaped picture disc

"The One to Sing the Blues" is a song by the British rock band Motörhead, which Epic Records released in a number of formats; 7-inch and 12-inch singles, cassette-single, CD-single as well as a shaped picture disc. It reached number 45 in the UK Singles Chart. It is the opening track on the 1916 album. It was the band's first CD single.

Although its release was planned for January 1991, Lemmy stated it "came out a few weeks earlier – on my birthday, as a matter of fact", which is 24 December 1990 continuing to say "that's a really great song – maybe we'll put it back in the set one of these days".

== Critical reception ==
In review of 5 January 1991 Paul Elliott of Sounds found the main riff of this song "somewhere between Thin Lizzy's 'Sha La La' and 'Massacre', with some killer lead from Würzel." In the end Elliott summarized: "Still the ugliest, still the loudest."

== Single track listing ==
All songs were written by Lemmy, Würzel, Phil Campbell, and Phil Taylor.

=== 7-inch single ===
1. "The One to Sing the Blues" – 3:07
2. "Dead Man's Hand" – 3:29

=== 12-inch and CD singles ===
1. "The One to Sing the Blues" – 3:07
2. "Dead Man's Hand" – 3:29
3. "Eagle Rock" – 3:07
4. "Shut You Down" – 2:38

== Personnel ==
- Lemmy – bass guitar, lead vocals
- Würzel – guitar
- Phil "Wizzö" Campbell – guitar
- Phil "Philthy Animal" Taylor – drums
