= Snake Bite Love =

Studio album by Motörhead
- Released: 10 March 1998
- Recorded: 1998
- Studio: In the Valley
- Genre: Heavy metal
- Length: 44:53
- Label: SPV/Steamhammer (Europe); CMC International (US)
- Producer: Howard Benson & Motörhead

Motörhead chronology
Protect the Innocent (1997)	Snake Bite Love (1998)	Everything Louder than Everyone Else (1999)

Snake Bite Love is the fourteenth studio album by British rock band Motörhead. It was released on 10 March 1998 via Steamhammer, their third with the label.

== Recording ==
Snake Bite Love would be the final album co-produced with Howard Benson. By all accounts, the recording was rushed, with drummer Mikkey Dee quoted in the 2011 Motörhead book Overkill: The Untold Story of Motörhead:

"we were stressed out of our minds when we did that album. It turned out OK, but no more than OK. We all know it; we should've had three more weeks on that and it would've been a great album. I blame it completely on the time we had. For instance, we put on the worst song we ever had, which is "Night Side," it's the worst shit we've ever done, and we thought it was shit when we did it. We had no time to write another tune, we had nothing left...So we all feel the same about that album. I've heard people say, "That's the best album you've got" and I'm like "What planet are you from?"

Lemmy was far kinder to the LP in his autobiography White Line Fever, feeling it "came out quite nicely" but admits it was recorded "all over the place." Lemmy recalls that the making of Snake Bite Love was quite normal for the band:

"six weeks before we recorded it, we didn't even have one song. But when it came time, we put it together very quickly. Unfortunately, I was sick for some of the rehearsals, and when you leave two guys together who aren't singers, you end up with some weird arrangements."

He points particularly to "Desperate for You" and "Night Side" in this respect and explains how the title track started as a completely different song; Dee recorded the drums tracks against a totally different set of chords, then it went back to Sweden where Campbell stated he was sick of the song and didn't like it. Lemmy agreed and Campbell came up with a new riff and changed the whole thing. Lemmy admits that the album is a prime example of him writing the words at the last minute, and adds:

"you know, lazy son of a bitch one more time, right?"

== Release ==
In the Motörhead documentary The Guts and the Glory, Lemmy admits that Snake Bite Love "had two turkeys on it" — referring to "Desperate For You" and "Better Off Dead", although he did acknowledge that fans liked the tracks. Campbell is jokingly credited in the album's liner notes as an unpronounceable glyph ("The Artist Frequently Seen at the Liquor Store"), mocking Prince.

== Reception ==
Professional ratings
Review scores
Source	Rating
AllMusic	2.5/5 stars
Collector's Guide to Heavy Metal	8/10
The Encyclopedia of Popular Music	3/5 stars
Rock Hard	8.0/10

Reviewers have noted the album shows the less heavier side of Motörhead as there are "one or two too many slower tracks, but it's still heavy for the most part" and having a mixture of musical ideas, ranging from the true metal of "Dogs of War" and "Assassin" to rock and roll influenced songs like "Snake Bite Love" and "Don't Lie to Me".

AllMusic's Stephen Thomas Erlewine calls Snake Bite Love:

"an undistinguished album...There isn't necessarily anything wrong with the record, as it offers a solid set of blistering, heavy rockers that race by at breakneck speed, but it doesn't add any new twists to the formula or have particularly memorable songs."

In 2011, Motörhead biographer Joel McIver deemed it "solid, reliable, and not hugely memorable."

== Track listing ==
All tracks are written by Kilmister, Campbell, Dee except where noted.

CD
No.	Title	Writer(s)	Length
1.	"Love for Sale"		4:52
2.	"Dogs of War"		3:38
3.	"Snake Bite Love"		3:30
4.	"Assassin"		4:48
5.	"Take the Blame"		4:03
6.	"Dead and Gone"		4:18
7.	"Night Side"		3:37
8.	"Don't Lie to Me"	Kilmister	3:59
9.	"Joy of Labour"		4:52
10.	"Desperate for You"		3:27
11.	"Better Off Dead"		3:42
Total length:			44:53

== Personnel ==
Per the album's liner notes.

- Lemmy – lead vocals, bass
- Phil Campbell – lead guitar
- Mikkey Dee – drums

Production

- Howard Benson – producer
- Chris Morrison – assistant engineer
- Greg D'Angelo – assistant engineer
- Kris Solem – mastering
- Motörhead – co-producers
- Joe Petagno – Snaggletooth, album cover
- Glen Laferman – photography

== Charts ==
Chart (1998)	Peak position
German Albums (Offizielle Top 100)	47
Swedish Albums (Sverigetopplistan)	49
UK Independent Albums (OCC)	22
UK Rock & Metal Albums (OCC)	9
