= Hellraiser (song) =

Song written by Ozzy Osbourne, Zakk Wylde and Lemmy Kilmister

"Hellraiser" is a song written by Ozzy Osbourne, Zakk Wylde, and Lemmy Kilmister. It was recorded by Osbourne for his 1991 album No More Tears and also by Motörhead for their 1992 March ör Die album. Motörhead's version was released as a single.

== Ozzy Osbourne version ==
"Hellraiser"

Song by Ozzy Osbourne

from the album No More Tears
- Released: 19 October 1991
- Recorded: 1991
- Genre: Heavy metal
- Length: 4:51
- Label: Epic
- Songwriters: Ozzy Osbourne; Zakk Wylde; Lemmy Kilmister
- Producers: Duane Baron; John Purdell

The song appeared in the first trailer for Painkiller. It was also used as entrance music by the professional wrestling tag team The Hell Raisers (Hawk Warrior and Power Warrior) in New Japan Pro-Wrestling. It is also featured in Grand Theft Auto: San Andreas.

=== Personnel ===
- Ozzy Osbourne – vocals
- Randy Castillo – drums
- John Sinclair – keyboards
- Zakk Wylde – guitars
- Bob Daisley – bass

== Motörhead version ==
"Hellraiser"

Single by Motörhead

from the album March ör Die
- B-side: "Name in Vain"; "Dead Man's Hand"
- Released: 1992
- Recorded: 1992; Music Grinder Studios
- Genre: Heavy metal
- Length: 4:38
- Label: Epic; Sony
- Producers: Peter Solley; Billy Sherwood

Motörhead singles chronology
"The One to Sing the Blues" (1990)	"Hellraiser" (1992)	"Don't Let Daddy Kiss Me" (1993)

Motörhead's recording of the song was used in the 1992 film Hellraiser III: Hell on Earth, and was released as the A-side of the single and as the sixth track on their tenth studio album, March ör Die. The track also appears on the '92 Tour EP.

The B-sides of the CD single were "Name in Vain", which also appears on the album March ör Die, and "Dead Man's Hand" (which was also released on The One to Sing the Blues CD single, 7" and 12" vinyl singles).

"Hellraiser" is the first of two tracks that Mikkey Dee recorded with Motörhead before officially joining the band, the other being "Hell on Earth", which also featured on the Hellraiser III soundtrack.

A video for "Hellraiser" was made, featuring Lemmy playing poker against Pinhead (Doug Bradley) from the Hellraiser films. It was directed by Clive Barker who wrote and directed the original Hellraiser.

This version also has some minor lyrical alterations.

=== Single track listing ===
1. "Hellraiser" (Ozzy Osbourne, Zakk Wylde, Lemmy)
2. "Name in Vain" (Phil Campbell, Würzel, Lemmy)
3. "Dead Man's Hand" (Campbell, Würzel, Lemmy, Phil Taylor)

=== Personnel ===
- Lemmy – vocals, bass
- Phil "Wizzo" Campbell – guitars
- Michael "Würzel" Burston – guitars, guitar solo
- Mikkey Dee – drums

== Reception ==
AllMusic wrote about the Osbourne version: "In a lesser artist the lyrics might come across as calculating, but Osbourne imbues their credibility with his well-defined self-awareness." In 2025, Rolling Stone compared the two versions: "Ozzy’s version [...] is solid fist-pump, but on Motorhead’s 1992 take feels heavier, with Lemmy’s bass swinging like a wrecking ball."

== 30th anniversary ==
On 29 October 2021, a new version of "Hellraiser" was released to commemorate its 30th anniversary. It features a mashup of both Ozzy and Lemmy's vocals in one song, using the former's version as the main template. An official animated music video, with Ozzy, Lemmy and Phil Taylor fighting against humanity transformed into zombies via their mobile phones, and later the demons responsible for the change. The video was directed by Mark Szumski and Gina Niespodziani, and released on YouTube the same day.

The video starts with the duo playing an arcade video game, as that used to be a frequent hobby of Lemmy. Guitarist Zakk Wylde said about them: "Lemmy was buddies with Ozzy forever. They toured Europe together when Saint Rhoads (Note: Friendly nickname for former guitarist Randy Rhoads.) was in the band and Lemmy would take Randy out to go play Asteroids wherever they went. So it was just a quick phonecall – 'can you write some songs?' 'sure'". Ozzy said "I had great fun with Lemmy – you couldn't be serious around him. Even just writing the songs, we could instinctively tell whether it was going to be good or not. We always used to go out to the pub and have a real laugh. It was a true rock'n'roll lifestyle he lived and I miss him terribly, you know".
