= Overnight Sensation =

Studio album by Motörhead
- Released: 15 October 1996
- Recorded: 1996
- Studio: Ocean Studios, Burbank, California, Track House Recording Studio, St. Louis, Missouri
- Genre: Heavy metal; hard rock
- Length: 41:19
- Label: SPV/Steamhammer (Europe); CMC International (US)
- Producer: Howard Benson, Duane Baron, Ryan Dorn, Motörhead

Motörhead chronology
Sacrifice (1995)	Overnight Sensation (1996)	Protect the Innocent (1997)

Overnight Sensation is the thirteenth studio album by British rock band Motörhead. It was released on 15 October 1996 via Steamhammer, their second on the label. It is their first album to feature a trio line-up since Another Perfect Day (1983). It would also mark the band's last lineup change and longest remaining one prior their dissolution in 2015. Overnight Sensation was also the band's second official record for CMC International. Sacrifice (1995) had already been issued in the US, but the label proved itself with Overnight Sensation and it became the best-distributed record the band had for some time. It charted in Germany, Sweden and Finland.

== Recording ==
The album was Motörhead's third album with producer Howard Benson. Following the departure of Würzel (Michael Burston) in 1995, the band returned to the same three-man "classic Motörhead line up"; bass guitar/vocals, lead guitar, and drums. In a rare outside songwriter credit, Swedish Erotica guitarist Magnus Axx contributed to writing the song "Civil War". This album was also the first since Ace of Spades (1980) to have a picture of the band on the cover. Despite being only a three-piece band, the band had a heavier style on this work than on its previous album, Sacrifice. Vocalist and bassist Lemmy Kilmister recalls that, amidst the touring, the record took about four weeks to write new songs and two months to record in the studio. Lemmy talked about the return to being a three piece:

"It went the same as a four-piece except one guy wasn't there! Or the same as the Everly Brothers plus one. It was a bit more fraught, but that was just because Phil, being the only guitarist, felt that there was a lot riding on his shoulders (which there was). So he was under added pressure, but he proved himself well. Overnight Sensation is a great album for him. Mikkey was his usual perfect self – he always finishes his drums tracks well ahead of schedule. This time around he did them in one day."

== Release ==
In Joel McIver's 2011 book Overkill: The Untold Story of Motörhead, drummer Mikkey Dee is quoted saying that the songwriting was affected by guitarist Würzel's departure:

"Würzel, I used to say, was more Motörhead than me, Phil and Lemmy put together. He was a true Motörheader, you know. He wrote super-hard songs and riffs, and I miss that sometimes. Because me and Phil, we might sometimes write a little too ... not soft, but maybe too musically correct songs, where Würzel was very simple, straight, very hard riffs. Nothing complicated with him whatsoever."

The album is notable for featuring a picture of Lemmy without his trademark mutton chops. He regrew them in 2001 and would retain them until his death.

Lemmy appraised the album in the 2004 Motörhead documentary The Guts and the Glory, stating:

"That was a great album, I liked Overnight a lot. I was very pleased with that."

== Reception ==
Professional ratings
Review scores
Source	Rating
AllMusic	4/5 stars
Collector's Guide to Heavy Metal	9/10
The Encyclopedia of Popular Music	3/5 stars
Rock Hard	8.0/10
Sputnikmusic	3.5/5

AllMusic calls the LP:

"[...] the band's most eclectic in years, its tracks range from pedal to the metal stompers like 'Civil War' and 'Eat the Gun' to mid-paced groovers like 'Listen to Your Heart' (featuring acoustic guitars – shock!) and the classy 'I Don't Believe a Word.' Always a great lyricist, vocalist/bassist Lemmy takes it up a notch with the highly ironic title track and what is quite possibly the band's greatest song of the decade, the exceptionally funny ′Crazy Like a Fox.'"

Lee Marlow of Classic Rock stated in 2013 that Overnight Sensation was:

"immediate proof that the latest three-man Motörhead line-up was more than a match for all previous incarnations."

== Track listing ==
All tracks are written by Kilmister, Campbell, Dee, except where noted

CD
No.	Title	Writer(s)	Length
1.	"Civil War"	Kilmister, Dee, Campbell, Max Ax	3:01
2.	"Crazy Like a Fox"		4:32
3.	"I Don't Believe a Word"		6:31
4.	"Eat the Gun"		2:13
5.	"Overnight Sensation"		4:10
6.	"Love Can't Buy You Money"		3:06
7.	"Broken"		4:34
8.	"Them Not Me"		2:47
9.	"Murder Show"		3:03
10.	"Shake the World"		3:29
11.	"Listen to Your Heart"	Kilmister	3:45
Total length:			41:19

== Personnel ==
Per the album's liner notes.

- Lemmy – lead vocals, bass, harmonica on "Crazy Like a Fox", acoustic guitar on "Overnight Sensation" and "Listen to Your Heart"
- Phil Campbell – guitars
- Mikkey Dee – drums

Production

- Howard Benson – producer
- Duane Baron – producer, mixing
- Ryan Dorn – co-producer, mixing
- James Ornelas – assistant engineer
- Evan Levy – assistant engineer
- Dwayne Baron – assistant engineer
- Dan Hersch – mastering
- Motörhead – co-producers
- Diane Medak – production coordinator
- Annamaria DiSanto – album cover
- Shannon Crawford – album cover

== Charts ==
Chart (1996)	Peak position
Finnish Albums (Suomen virallinen lista)	39
German Albums (Offizielle Top 100)	71
Swedish Albums (Sverigetopplistan)	60
UK Rock & Metal Albums (OCC)	22

Chart (2021)	Peak position
German Albums (Offizielle Top 100)	70
Scottish Albums (OCC)	34
UK Independent Albums (OCC)	18
UK Rock & Metal Albums (OCC)	8
