= Bastards (Motörhead album) =

Studio album by Motörhead
- Released: 11 October 1993
- Recorded: 1993
- Studio: A&M Studios and Prime Time Studios, Hollywood, California
- Genre: Heavy metal
- Length: 47:50
- Label: ZYX Music
- Producer: Howard Benson

Motörhead chronology
The Best of Motörhead (1993)	Bastards (1993)	All the Aces (1993)

Singles from Bastards
- 1. "Don't Let Daddy Kiss Me" Released: 1993; 2. "Born to Raise Hell" Released: October 1994

Bastards is the eleventh studio album by British rock band Motörhead. It was released on 11 October 1993 via ZYX Music, the band's only release on this label. It is the band's first studio album to feature the drummer Mikkey Dee, who also featured as guest drummer on the previous album.

== Recording ==
It is one of two studio albums with the short-lived Lemmy, Würzel, Zööm and Mikkey Dee lineup, as on the previous album Dee was a 'special guest' drummer and had not officially joined the band. It was also the first of four Motörhead albums to be produced by former Child'ƨ Play producer Howard Benson, and the first Motörhead studio album not to contain a title track. After unsuccessfully commercialising the success of 1916 with its 1992 follow-up March ör Die, the band returned to their roots: being loud and fast. The lyrical themes range from social criticism ("On Your Feet or on Your Knees"), to war ("Death or Glory" and "I am the Sword") to child abuse ("Don't Let Daddy Kiss Me") and total mayhem ("Burner"). Lemmy also states in his memoir that he offered "Don't Let Daddy Kiss Me" to both Joan Jett and Lita Ford:

"cause I thought a girl should sing it but no one ever took it up."

== Release ==
It was barely released outside of the label's home country of Germany, other than the originally released series worldwide, until the 2001 Steamhammer reissue, and had to be imported otherwise. Bastards is cited by the band as one of their best works. In the documentary The Guts and the Glory, guitarist Phil Campbell enthuses:

"we worked so fucking hard on that. The songs were there, the commitment was there, the playing was there, production was there, everything was there...I'm so proud of that album. Nothing wrong with that album at all. Some great songs."

In his autobiography White Line Fever, frontman Lemmy calls it:

"one of the best albums we ever did."

However, he laments that the band's record label, the German-based ZYX, did not promote it outside of Germany.

"It's just so disappointing when you pull out all the stops for an album and you're really thrilled with it and nobody else cares, especially not your record company."

The song "Born to Raise Hell" was later re-recorded with Ice-T and Ugly Kid Joe vocalist Whitfield Crane and released as a single (including a version on picture disc). This version of the song was featured in the movie Airheads.

== Artwork ==
Joe Petagno, long-time Motörhead sleeve artist, revealed in a rare interview on the Inferno 30th Anniversary edition bonus DVD that the album was originally to be titled Devils. He had already drawn up a cover to reflect this title when it was changed. As well as alluding to the original name of the album, Petagno also had this insight into the concept of the album cover:

"Bastards was a design I did in reply to March ör Die. That fucking horrible sleeve. It pissed me off. It was the worst thing I'd ever seen in my life. So I thought, okay, they want something like that, I'll do it properly. [I] sent it to the Motörheadbangers fan club, Alan Burridge, and he liked it so much that he put it on the cover of the fan magazine. When Lemmy saw it, he wanted it, so Devils became Bastards."

== Reception ==
Professional ratings
Review scores
Source	Rating
AllMusic	4/5 stars
Robert Christgau	(1-star Honorable Mention)
Collector's Guide to Heavy Metal	10/10
The Encyclopedia of Popular Music	3/5 stars
Entertainment Weekly	A−
Spin Alternative Record Guide	3/10
Sputnikmusic	4.5/5 stars

Bastards reached number 28 in Germany and also charted in Sweden and Japan. The AllMusic review states:

"gloriously distorted thrashers such as 'On Your Feet or on Your Knees' and 'Death or Glory' set the pace, and 'Born to Raise Hell' is undoubtedly one of the band's greatest latter-day classics."

Ultimate Classic Rock ranked Bastards as the fourth-best Motörhead album, commenting:

"Motörhead's remarkably efficient response to the all-time career low of March or Die, 1993's Bastards now stands as one of their greatest achievements."

== Track listing ==
All tracks are written by Kilmister, Campbell, Burston, Dee except where noted.

CD
No.	Title	Writer(s)	Length
1.	"On Your Feet or on Your Knees"		2:34
2.	"Burner"		2:52
3.	"Death or Glory"		4:50
4.	"I Am the Sword"		4:28
5.	"Born to Raise Hell"	Kilmister	4:58
6.	"Don't Let Daddy Kiss Me"	Kilmister	4:05
7.	"Bad Woman"		3:16
8.	"Liar"		4:12
9.	"Lost in the Ozone"		3:27
10.	"I'm Your Man"		3:28
11.	"We Bring the Shake"		3:48
12.	"Devils"		6:00
Total length:			47:50

Steamhammer 2001 reissue
No.	Title	Writer(s)	Length
13.	"Jumpin' Jack Flash" (The Rolling Stones cover)	Mick Jagger, Keith Richards	3:20

== Personnel ==
Per the album's liner notes.

- Lemmy – vocals, bass guitars, acoustic guitar
- Phil "Zööm" Campbell – lead guitars, acoustic guitar
- Würzel – lead guitars, rhythm guitar
- Mikkey Dee – drums

Additional musicians

- Howard Benson – ritchy keyboards
- Michael Monroe - backing vocals (Track 5)

Production

- Howard Benson – producer, mixing
- Ryan Dorn – engineer, mixing
- John Aguto, Randy Wine, Darrin Mann, John Gaudesi, Gregg Barrett, Devin Foutz – assistant engineers
- Eddy Schreyer – mastering
- Henri Clausei – photography
- Lisa Lake, Connie Williamson – art design and layout
- Joe Petagno – Snaggletooth, album cover

== Charts ==
Chart (1993)	Peak position
Finnish Albums (The Official Finnish Charts)	37
German Albums (Offizielle Top 100)	28
Swedish Albums (Sverigetopplistan)	48
