= Sacrifice (Motörhead album) =

Studio album by Motörhead
- Released: 27 March 1995
- Recorded: 1994
- Studio: Cherokee Studios, Hollywood, California
- Genre: Heavy metal
- Length: 36:44
- Label: SPV/Steamhammer (Europe); CMC International (US)
- Producer: Howard Benson, Ryan Dorn & Motörhead

Motörhead chronology
Live at Brixton '87 (1994)	Sacrifice (1995)	Overnight Sensation (1996)

Sacrifice is the twelfth studio album by British rock band Motörhead. It was released on 27 March 1995 via SPV/Steamhammer, the band's first release on the label. It is the second and final album to feature the four-piece lineup of Lemmy, Phil Campbell, Würzel, and Mikkey Dee, as Würzel left the band after the album's recording. It is also the last album to feature any four-piece band lineup as they would revert back to a trio-lineup starting with Overnight Sensation (1996)

== Recording ==
Motörhead reunited with producer Howard Benson for Sacrifice. "This is a very good album", vocalist and bassist Lemmy wrote in the sleeve notes, "Put it in your system and your girlfriend's clothes fall off." Lemmy views Sacrifice as one of his favourite records the band has made, despite the difficulties involved, which he explained as:

"Howard was producing us again, but he'd also just got an A&R gig with a label called Giant. So his mind was in at least two or three different places, and half the time the engineer, Ryan Dorn, was holding it all together, following the direction Howard gave him. And it was becoming clearer every day that Würzel was on his way out of the band. He wouldn't extend himself at all, and usually just sat there while we were writing songs, with his guitar across his knee. When we stopped playing, he stopped playing and when we started again, he would too."

In the documentary The Guts and the Glory, all three band members express regret over Würzel's departure, but insist it was inevitable, with drummer Mikkey Dee commenting:

"I remember when it happened, it was both panic and satisfaction at the same time because Würzel was also very tired of us and we were very tired of him. It was a mutual thing. I miss him tremendously as a guy, but not as a guitar player. He was no good in the end."

Dee added in 2021 that Würzel's wife was to be blamed for his departure from the band, calling her a "bitch."

Campbell, who joined Motörhead with Würzel in 1984, recalls:

"It took him six hours to try and do a solo on this one song on Sacrifice and in the end he just fuckin' slammed the guitar down and legged it – took the guitar with him and that was basically it."

In the same film, Lemmy reveals that Würzel began to suspect that he was being ripped off financially:

"He only played one solo on the whole album. He was gone already before we started that album. His input was, like, very minimal. It's a shame about Würzel; he started to believe the wrong people. 'Cause I was his best friend in the band and offstage – I was his best friend – and he didn't believe that; he started accusing me of stealin' his money and shit, like I need Würzel's money. I mean, I've got all that money coming from Hawkwind before him and the Motörhead before him – I didn't need his fuckin' money, and I wouldn't have stolen it even if I did. That's not like me. But there he goes – you make your choices and suffer the consequences."

The band went into the studio with some great songs, Lemmy recalls, although "Sex & Death" was written in ten minutes on the last day of recording, "In Another Time" was altered beyond all recognition and there were three sets of lyrics for "Make 'Em Blind". Dee and Campbell didn't realise that "Out of the Sun" was only two and half verses and had rehearsed it as such but Lemmy added another section when nobody else was around, with him playing bass and Jamie, his guitar roadie, playing guitar. He then gave the others a tape of it. According to Lemmy, when Würzel played it in the rental car he nearly drove off the road. "Make 'Em Blind" came from improvisation, with Campbell recording the solo in one take, falling over the couch and onto his back laughing uproariously. Lemmy states that the album contains more nonsense than most of the previous album – the lyrics don't mean anything you can really get a hold of – but that they convey the mood, especially the title track and "Out of the Sun". "Dog Face Boy" is about Campbell, but Lemmy decided that only after having written it, likening the line "Poor boy out your mind again/Jet plane outside looking for another friend" to Campbell's habit of quickly hitting town and looking for fun after getting off the plane.

== Release ==
It was not a success nor did it make much impact on the album charts, as with the previous album, it was largely ignored by the general public. With a new label it was released correctly, compared to Bastards, and the title track has stayed in the live set for some time, but there hasn't been much written about this album that is noteworthy.

The title track was used in the movie Tromeo and Juliet, a film in which Lemmy appears.

The American version of the album cover had Würzel airbrushed out but, according to Joel McIver's book Overkill: The Untold Story of Motörhead, Lemmy insists that this was the record label's idea, not theirs:

"It's stupid, seeing how Würzel could sue us and he'd be right, because he's on the album."

Rather than hiring a new guitar player, the band decided to revert to a three-piece.

== Sleeve artwork ==
Joe Petagno, the sleeve artist, was well known for inserting references to genitalia in his drawings, and this one was no exception. He commented:

"they did everything in their power to get rid of those genitals [the tongue]. It's amazing how genitals can piss people off. This is Lemmy's and my little joke. We like genitals and Another Perfect Day had the double dog dick that we joke about. [The cover is the] hordes being sent to hell, where they deserve to be. And the never-ending battles, the hate, the war, the ignorance. Yet again. People think I am anti-religious, and I am. People think I am anti-state, and I am. People think I am anti-war, I am. I'm anti-anything that will get in the way of an individual becoming whole. My opinions are not about trying to provoke people to kill each other. I'm trying to heal the rift between man and spirit. I'm a scaremonger. I'm trying to scare people back onto the road [of justice and freedom]."

== Critical reception ==
Professional ratings
Review scores
Source	Rating
AllMusic	3.5/5 stars
Collector's Guide to Heavy Metal	8/10
Rock Hard	9/10

AllMusic states that:

"Sacrifice doesn't offer anything new, nor does it display a newfound subtlety. It's just straight-ahead, breakneck fast, ear-shatteringly loud Motörhead, with buzzing guitars, near-martial rhythms, and surprisingly catchy hooks."

In 2011, Motörhead biographer Joel McIver wrote that Sacrifice "was exactly what you expect: a decent, if unspectacular, Motörhead record with a couple classics song here and there."

== Track listing ==
All tracks are written by Kilmister, Campbell, Burston, Dee except where noted.

CD
No.	Title	Writer(s)	Length
1.	"Sacrifice"		3:16
2.	"Sex & Death"		2:02
3.	"Over Your Shoulder"		3:17
4.	"War for War"		3:08
5.	"Order/Fade to Black"		4:02
6.	"Dog-Face Boy"		3:25
7.	"All Gone to Hell"		3:41
8.	"Make 'Em Blind"	Kilmister	4:25
9.	"Don't Waste Your Time"	Kilmister	2:32
10.	"In Another Time"		3:09
11.	"Out of the Sun"		3:43
Total length:			36:44

== Personnel ==
Per the Sacrifice liner notes.

- Lemmy – lead vocals, bass
- Phil "Zööm" Campbell – guitars; guitar solo on all tracks except "Dog Face Boy"
- Michael "Würzel" Burston – guitars; guitar solo on "Dog Face Boy" and "Out of the Sun"
- Mikkey Dee – drums

Additional musicians

- Bill Bergman – saxophone on "Don't Waste Your Time"
- John Paroulo – piano on "Don't Waste Your Time"

Note: Würzel is uncredited on the North American CD release album liner notes, that was also sold in other territories, other than to state he played guitar solo on two tracks. He is not listed as a member of the band, or for writing credits either, even though he plays rhythm guitar on the entire album.
The SPV German/European release of the album has the correct liner notes; Würzels thank-you's, writing credits, etc.

Production

- Howard Benson – producer, mixing
- Ryan Dorn – producer, engineer, mixing
- Devin Foutz – assistant engineer
- Matthew Ellard – assistant engineer
- Eddy Schreyer – mastering
- Motörhead – executive producers
- Gene Kirkland – photography
- Robert John – photography
- DemoNet, Inc – art design and layout
- David Patterson – typeface and pagemaster
- Joe Petagno – Snaggletooth, album cover

== Charts ==
Chart (1995)	Peak position
Finnish Albums (The Official Finnish Charts)	32
German Albums (Offizielle Top 100)	31
Swedish Albums (Sverigetopplistan)	36
UK Rock & Metal Albums (OCC)	21
