= Orgasmatron (album) =

Studio album by Motörhead
- Released: 21 July 1986
- Recorded: 1986
- Studio: Master Rock Studios (London)
- Genre: Heavy metal
- Length: 35:36
- Label: GWR
- Producers: Bill Laswell; Jason Corsaro

Motörhead chronology
| No Remorse (1984) | Orgasmatron (1986) | Rock 'n' Roll (1987) |

Singles from Orgasmatron
- 1. "Deaf Forever" Released: June 1986

Orgasmatron is the seventh studio album by English rock band Motörhead, released in July 1986 by GWR Records, the band's first album with the label.

It is the band's first album to feature two guitarists Phil "Wizzö" Campbell and Michael "Würzel" Burston, and also the only full Motörhead studio album to feature Pete Gill on the drums, although all three also played on the new tracks recorded for the compilation album No Remorse, recorded and released in 1984. This is also the band's first album featuring a four-piece band lineup, instead of a usual trio.

On 24 September, 2026, Motörhead announced a 40th Anniversary reissue of Orgasmatron with a newly made remix by Cameron Webb, Motörhead's producer from 2004-2015, along with a new remaster of the original Bill Laswell and Jason Corsaro mix and newly found outtakes.

== Background ==
After leaving Bronze Records on bad terms, Motörhead kept touring without the benefit of a record deal, in spite of being cited as a key influence for the thrash metal subgenre that was becoming popular with heavy metal fans in the mid-1980s. In Overkill: The Untold Story of Motörhead, Joel McIver quotes frontman Lemmy from that period:

"Elektra passed. MCA passed. CBS passed. Epic passed. Chrysalis passed. Everyone passed. Hell, I wish we sold as many albums as we do T-shirts. In England, it's pretty well over for us as far as selling a lot of albums is concerned."

After their ongoing lawsuit with their old label was settled in their favour, Motörhead and its management set up their own label GWR (Great Western Road) to release their music.

== Recording ==
Orgasmatron was produced by maverick songwriter and musician Bill Laswell, who had previously produced acts as varied as Herbie Hancock, Mick Jagger, and PIL. The album was recorded in eleven days at Master Rock Studios in London. It was the band's first full studio album in three years and got Motörhead back on track after the critically acclaimed but commercially unsuccessful 1983 album Another Perfect Day, making it to number 21 in the UK charts. In his autobiography White Line Fever, Lemmy states:

"As it turned out, Bill was good for getting sounds, but he fucked everything up in the mix. It was a much better album when he took it to New York than when he brought it back... It was dreadful. Orgasmatron was mud."

Lemmy also wrote that the album title had nothing to do with the orgasm-inducing machine that appeared in the futuristic Woody Allen film Sleeper, which he had not even seen, and that the working title for the album had been Riding with the Driver. In the Motörhead documentary The Guts and the Glory, guitarist Phil Campbell laments:

"I think the production let us down on Orgasmatron. The songs were really good. We put a lot of effort into the songs."

Campbell added that Laswell tried to meld "early hip-hop type sounds" with Motörhead's music and it did not come off. The title track reflects Lemmy's revulsion with hypocrisy. Joel McIver quotes Lemmy in his Motörhead memoir Overkill:The Untold Story of Motörhead:

"It refers to the three things that I hate most in life - organized religion, politics and war. Things like people that go to church and cum in their pants while communicating with Jesus Christ. It's all a bunch of bullshit. If you're really into that, you don't need to go to church or talk to God, you can talk to Him everywhere, you know? Or if you join a political party and get your jollies off that, when your party wins and all that. It's the herd instinct. The same thing with war. They give you a nice new uniform and march you off to die."

On the Orgasmatron tour, the band once again tried to follow up the popular bomber lighting rig that they had used for years at their live shows with an "Orgasmatron machine" but the prop – like the giant iron fist prop from the Iron Fist tour – was a disaster. Lemmy recalled to Uncut's John Robinson in 2015:

"We had this huge Orgasmatron thing and after we built it...we realized we couldn't get it into most of the venues – isn't that wonderful?"

The song "Orgasmatron" was re-recorded in 2000 and was available as an Internet download under the name "Orgasmatron 2000". It was later included on the band's 2003 five-disc box-set Stone Deaf Forever!.

== Artwork ==
The album's working title was Ridin' with the Driver and later changed to Orgasmatron; it was too late for Joe Petagno to change the cover art and the train design was used. As well as alluding to the original name of the album, Petagno also commented on the concept behind the album cover on the Inferno 30th Anniversary bonus DVD: "Lemmy was living on a houseboat then, and collecting train models. He said, 'You know, Joseph, I want a fucking train.' It seemed weird to me...but, yet again it worked." The preliminary sketch had the Orgasmatron train going in the opposite direction, but Petagno "decided to turn it so it was going out of the picture rather than coming into it. It gave me a lot of trouble, because [of] trying to fit the head in front of the train with this cow scoop. But it worked in the end."

== Release ==
Like Motörhead's previous album, Another Perfect Day, Orgasmatron had only limited commercial success. Some of the album's material remained in the band's live set on and off over the years: "Doctor Rock" opened the live sets for a time; "Built for Speed", a reference to Lemmy's drug of choice and the style of music they played, was played for some years; "Deaf Forever", "Nothing Up My Sleeve", "Mean Machine" all had a run as well.

== Reception ==
Professional ratings
Review scores
| Source | Rating |
|---|---|
| AllMusic | 3/5 stars |
| Blabbermouth | 9/10 |
| Robert Christgau | A− |
| Collector's Guide to Heavy Metal | 7/10 |
| The Encyclopedia of Popular Music | 4/5 stars |
| Spin Alternative Record Guide | 5/10 |
| Uncut | 4/5 stars |

The album received generally positive reviews. Robert Christgau, who gave it a positive review, stated: "I admire metal's integrity, brutality, and obsessiveness, but I can't stand its delusions of grandeur--the way it apes and misapprehends reactionary notions of nobility. One thing I like about Lemmy is that he's proud to be a clod; common as muck and dogged in his will to make himself felt as just that. Add that rarest of metal virtues, a sense of humor, which definitely extends to the music's own conventions, as on the lead cut of his first album in three litigation-packed years: 'Deaf Forever,' a good enough joke right there (especially for Sabbath fans), it turns out to be a battlefield anthem--about a corpse. And then add Bill Laswell, who was born to make megalomania signify: where most metal production gravitates toward a dull thud that highlights the shriek of the singer and the comforting reverberation of the signature guitar, Laswell's fierce clarity cracks like a whip, inspiring Lemmy, never a slowpoke in this league, to bellow one called 'Built for Speed.' Result: work of art."

The AllMusic review states:

"Laswell does beef up the mix with added sonic detail, which works to particularly good effect on the title track, the densely layered production helps transform the song and its simple riff into a chugging psychedelic noise-fest. Elsewhere, the production sometimes has the effect of muting the band's energy, sounding oddly processed and lacking the raw bite of past work (which foreshadows their decline over the next few years)."

In 2005, Orgasmatron was ranked number 313 in Rock Hard magazine's book of The 500 Greatest Rock & Metal Albums of All Time. In 1991, Chuck Eddy ranked Orgasmastron at number 72 in his book of the 500 best heavy metal albums. He notes that it "in no way caters" to speed metal, as evidenced by record's "explicitly disco-influenced backbeat", the slower songs with 'rapped' vocals that form its centrepiece, the excessive production from Laswell (who typically works with artists like Afrika Bambaataa or Herbie Hancock) and it appearing on "a label that usually works with Run-D.M.C.", as well as the Woody Allen reference of the title. Considering it to be simultaneously the most commercial and riskiest music Motörhead ever recorded, Eddy credits Laswell for accentuating the band's attack by placing the bottom end forward and writes: "Each side begins with a gargantuan syncopation-rock 'dance'-tune, breaks down to a couple familiarly rebellious rapid-fire detonations, then climaxes with a claustrophobic nightmare framed in no-wave white noise."

== Track listing ==
All tracks are written by Kilmister, Burston, Campbell, Gill.

Side A
| No. | Title | Length |
|---|---|---|
| 1. | "Deaf Forever" | 4:25 |
| 2. | "Nothing Up My Sleeve" | 3:11 |
| 3. | "Ain't My Crime" | 3:42 |
| 4. | "Claw" | 3:31 |
| 5. | "Mean Machine" | 2:57 |

Side B
| No. | Title | Length |
|---|---|---|
| 6. | "Built for Speed" | 4:56 |
| 7. | "Ridin' with the Driver" | 3:47 |
| 8. | "Doctor Rock" | 3:37 |
| 9. | "Orgasmatron" | 5:27 |
| Total length: | | 35:36 |

Castle Communications 1996 reissue bonus tracks
| No. | Title | Original release | Length |
|---|---|---|---|
| 10. | "On the Road" (Live in 1985) | 1986 ~ Deaf Forever | 4:59 |
| 11. | "Steal Your Face" (Live in 1985) | 1986 ~ Deaf Forever | 4:15 |
| 12. | "Claw" (Alternative Version) | | 3:31 |

=== Sanctuary Records 2006 2CD deluxe edition ===
Disc one contains the original album without bonus tracks. Tracks B1 & B2 are from the "Deaf Forever" 12-inch single. Track B3 is an alternative version previously unreleased. Tracks B4-14 are of the BBC Radio 1 broadcast of the band's performance at the Kerrang! Wooargh Weekender at Caister, England, on Saturday 13 October 1984.

All tracks are written by Kilmister, Burston, Campbell, Gill except where noted.

| No. | Title | Original release | Length |
|---|---|---|---|
| 1. | "On the Road" (Live in 1985) | 1986 ~ Deaf Forever | 4:59 |
| 2. | "Steal Your Face" (Live in 1985) | 1986 ~ Deaf Forever | 4:15 |
| 3. | "Claw" (Alternative Version) | | 3:31 |

BBC In-Concert, 1984
| No. | Title | Writer(s) | Original release | Length |
|---|---|---|---|---|
| 4. | "Stay Clean" | Kilmister, Clarke, Taylor | 1979 ~ Overkill | 2:33 |
| 5. | "Heart of Stone" | Kilmister, Clarke, Taylor | 1982 ~ Iron Fist | 2:56 |
| 6. | "Nothing Up My Sleeve" | | 1986 ~ Orgasmatron | 3:35 |
| 7. | "Metropolis" | Kilmister, Clarke, Taylor | 1979 ~ Overkill | 3:35 |
| 8. | "Killed by Death" | | 1984 ~ No Remorse | 3:39 |
| 9. | "Ace of Spades" | Kilmister, Clarke, Taylor | 1980 ~ Ace of Spades | 5:34 |
| 10. | "Steal Your Face" | | 1984 ~ No Remorse | 4:33 |
| 11. | "(We Are) The Road Crew" | Kilmister, Clarke, Taylor | 1980 ~ Ace of Spades | 2:34 |
| 12. | "Motörhead" | Kilmister | 1977 ~ Motörhead | 2:45 |
| 13. | "Bomber" | Kilmister, Clarke, Taylor | 1979 ~ Bomber | 3:45 |
| 14. | "Overkill" | Kilmister, Clarke, Taylor | 1979 ~ Overkill | 5:28 |

- Although the live recording is from 1984, it is the second-last live recording of the song "Motörhead" in a set list; as from the mid-1980s onward it was rarely played, and by the 1990s the song had been completely dropped.

=== 40th Anniversary Edition ===
| No. | Title | Length |
|---|---|---|
| 1. | "Deaf Forever" | 4:25 |
| 2. | "Nothing Up My Sleeve" | 3:11 |
| 3. | "Ain't My Crime" | 3:42 |
| 4. | "Claw" | 3:31 |
| 5. | "Mean Machine" | 2:54 |
| 6. | "Built for Speed" | 4:56 |
| 7. | "Ridin' with the Driver" | 3:47 |
| 8. | "Doctor Rock" | 3:37 |
| 9. | "Orgasmatron" | 5:22 |

Cameron Webb 40th Anniversary Remix
| No. | Title | Length |
|---|---|---|
| 10. | "Deaf Forever" | 4:25 |
| 11. | "Nothing Up My Sleeve" | 3:11 |
| 12. | "Ain't My Crime" | 3:42 |
| 13. | "Claw" | 3:31 |
| 14. | "Mean Machine" | 2:54 |
| 15. | "Built for Speed" | 4:56 |
| 16. | "Ridin' with the Driver" | 3:47 |
| 17. | "Doctor Rock" | 3:38 |
| 18. | "Orgasmatron" | 5:19 |

Studio and Alternate Versions
| No. | Title | Length |
|---|---|---|
| 19. | "Orgasmatron & On The Road - Studio Rehearsal" | 9:36 |
| 20. | "Mean Machine - Studio Outtake" | 3:24 |
| 21. | "Nothing Up My Sleeve - Studio Outtake" | 10:20 |
| 22. | "Doctor Rock/Ridin' with the Driver - Studio Rehearsal" | 8:07 |
| 23. | "Claw - Alternate Version" | 3:33 |

BBC Radio 1 Friday Rock Show, 16th August 1986
| No. | Title | Length |
|---|---|---|
| 24. | "Killed by Death" | 5:21 |
| 25. | "Orgasmatron" | 5:04 |
| 26. | "Doctor Rock" | 3:23 |
| 27. | "Deaf Forever" | 4:15 |
| 28. | "Orgasmatron - Spoken Word" | 1:26 |

== Personnel ==
Per the album's liner notes.

- Lemmy – bass, vocals
- Michael "Würzel" Burston – lead guitar
- Phil "Wizzö" Campbell – rhythm guitar
- Pete Gill – drums

=== Production ===
- Bill Laswell – production, engineering
- Jason "Kissogram" Corsaro – production, engineering
- Vic "Chairman" Maile – production, engineering (1996 reissue live tracks)
- Damian & Jeff – mixing
- Steve Rinkoff – mixing (1996 reissue)
- Nick Watson – mastering (2006 remaster)
- Curt Evans – 2005 cover design
- Joe Petagno – Snaggletooth
- Cameron Webb – 40th Anniversary remix

=== 2006 deluxe edition remaster ===
- Steve Hammonds – release coordination
- Jon Richards – release coordination
- Malcolm Dome – sleeve notes
- Mick Stevenson – project consultant, photos and archive memorabilia

== Charts ==
| Chart (1986–2026) | Peak position |
|---|---|
| Australian Albums (Kent Music Report) | 86 |
| Dutch Albums (Album Top 100) | 69 |
| Finnish Albums (The Official Finnish Charts) | 33 |
| German Albums (Offizielle Top 100) | 33 |
| German Rock & Metal Albums (Offizielle Top 100) | 15 |
| Greek Albums (IFPI) | 89 |
| Hungarian Physical Albums (MAHASZ) | 27 |
| UK Albums (Official Charts) | 21 |
| UK Independent Albums (Official Charts) | 13 |
| UK Rock & Metal Albums (Official Charts) | 4 |
| US Billboard 200 | 157 |
