= Killed by Death (song) =

Single by Motörhead

from the album No Remorse
- B-side: "Under the Knife"
- Released: 24 August 1984
- Recorded: 1984
- Genre: Heavy metal
- Length: 4:40
- Label: Bronze
- Songwriters: Phil Campbell; Würzel; Lemmy; Pete Gill
- Producers: Vic Maile; Guy Bidmead

Motörhead singles chronology
"Shine" (1983)	"Killed by Death" (1984)	"Deaf Forever" (1986)

"Killed by Death" is a song by the English heavy metal band Motörhead. Released in 1984, in 7" and 12" vinyl pressings. It peaked at number 51 on the UK singles chart.

== Promotion ==
To assist its promotion in the United States, Bronze/Island pressed a 12" promo version for radio play (identical versions on both sides). It is one of the most difficult to find of all Motörhead items. There is also a music video made for the track, directed by the manager of the Plasmatics, Rod Swenson, which was banned by MTV for "excessive and senseless violence".

Despite relatively high-profile exposure on TV programmes such as Channel 4's The Tube, the single failed to make any significant impression on the UK singles chart. This proved particularly disappointing to Lemmy, who at live shows regularly made joking references about its lack of sales.

== Releases ==
The original song is not included on any official release albums except the compilation album No Remorse (1984), along with three other new songs, "Snaggletooth", "Steal Your Face" and "Locomotive". It is included on several other retrospective budget-release compilations, and on live albums such as Nö Sleep at All (1988).

Both the 7" and 12" formats feature the B-side "Under the Knife". The 12" issue has a second B-side, a different track also entitled Under the Knife, and came with a free colour poster. The title song is taken from the No Remorse compilation album. Bronze Records also issued a shaped picture disc (approx 12") version of the 7" vinyl release, depicting the band's logo. Some lapses in quality control accidentally allowed a number of pressings that play King Kurt on the B-side.

== Live performances ==
The song itself used to be a mainstay of live performances since release. As with many Motörhead songs, the lyrics show Lemmy's skill at composing lyrics which are at the same time menacing and tongue-in-cheek. Another common theme is Lemmy's use of animal images. Phrases such as "If you squeeze my lizard, I'll put my snake on you, I'm a romantic adventure, and I'm a reptile too" recall the song "Love Me like a Reptile" from their fourth studio album Ace of Spades (1980). The second verse also contains the line, "I'm a lone-wolf ligger".

== Legacy ==
- A re-recorded version, entitled "Killed by Death '08", is in the Rock Band Metal Track Pack.
- In 2012, Loudwire ranked the song number two on their list of the top 10 Motörhead songs, and in 2021, Louder Sound ranked the song number 12 on their list of the top 50 Motörhead songs.
- The song was used in sequences set in hell in Heist (2008), a British one-off television comedy-drama.
- The song is featured in the action-adventure video game Scarface: The World Is Yours (2006).
- "Killed by Death" was covered by the German power metal band Paragon, by all-female Swedish metal band Crucified Barbara, and by Finnish power metal band Beast in Black on their second studio album From Hell with Love (2019).
- The lyrics of the song's first verse are used as an epigraph in Bruce Craven's 1993 novel Fast Sofa.
- "Killed by Death" was performed regularly by Phil Campbell and the Bastard Sons and is the final track on their 2023 live album Live in the North.

== Track listing ==
All tracks written by Lemmy, Würzel, Phil Campbell and Pete Gill.

7"
No.	Title	Length
1.	"Killed by Death"
2.	"Under the Knife"

12"
No.	Title	Length
1.	"Killed by Death (full-length version)"	4:39
2.	"Under the Knife"	3:43
3.	"Under the Knife"	4:31

== Personnel ==
Motörhead

- Lemmy – vocals, bass guitar
- Phil "Wizzö" Campbell – guitars
- Würzel – guitars
- Pete Gill – drums

Production

- Fin Costello – photography
- Steve Joule – designer
