= March ör Die =

Studio album by Motörhead
- Released: 27 July 1992
- Recorded: 1991–1992
- Studio: Music Grinder Studios (Los Angeles, California)
- Genre: Heavy metal
- Length: 46:46
- Label: WTG
- Producer: Peter Solley

Motörhead chronology
1916 (1991)	March ör Die (1992)	'92 Tour EP (1992)

Singles from March ör Die
- 1. "Hellraiser" Released: 1992

March ör Die is the tenth studio album by the English rock band Motörhead, released in July 1992. It would be the band's second and final album with WTG Records. The album features guest appearances by Ozzy Osbourne, Guns N' Roses guitarist Slash, and veteran drummer Tommy Aldridge. Aldridge stepped in after longtime member Phil Taylor was fired early in the recording process.

== Background ==
After years of lackluster sales and feuds with record labels in the late 1980s, Motörhead had enjoyed an incredible turnaround by 1992. After the critical success of 1916, which was nominated for a Grammy, Motörhead secured a second album deal with Sony. In addition, frontman Lemmy had co-written four songs for Ozzy Osbourne's 1991 blockbuster album No More Tears at the invitation of Ozzy's wife and manager Sharon Osbourne, including "I Don't Want to Change the World'", "Desire", "Hellraiser", and the hit single "Mama, I'm Coming Home", generating much needed income. In his autobiography White Line Fever, Lemmy recalls:

"That was one of the easiest gigs I ever had – Sharon rang me up and said, 'I'll give you X amount of money to write some songs for Ozzy', and I said, 'All right – you got a pen?' I wrote six or seven sets of words, and he ended up using four of them... I made more money out of writing those four songs than I made out of fifteen years of Motörhead – ludicrous, isn't it?!"

== Recording ==
The band reunited with producer Pete Solley, who produced their 1991 Grammy-nominated album 1916, to record March ör Die. Early in the recording, drummer Phil Taylor parted ways with Motörhead for a second time as his abilities and commitment came into question. Taylor had quit the band in 1984 to work on a new project with guitarist Brian Robertson but rejoined in 1987. In Joel McIver's Motörhead biography Overkill: The Untold Story of Motörhead, guitarist Phil Campbell discusses Taylor's second departure:

"He just didn't have it for some reason. It was getting bad. He couldn't play four bars without fucking up. For three years when he rejoined, we gave it our best shot, but... he couldn't see anything wrong with his drumming, which was even worse. We'd be in the studio practicing and he'd be out washing his car."

In the same book, Lemmy – while maintaining that Taylor's skills had deteriorated – admitted:

"The biggest blow was probably firing Phil Taylor the second time, because I would never have done it if he was pulling his weight, but he wasn't, and I couldn't make him do it. That was a blow, because I knew it was going to devastate him – and it did, and that really upset me."

Following Taylor's sudden departure in the midst of recording an album, the band scrambled to find a replacement. Subsequently, March ör Die features three drummers: Taylor, Tommy Aldridge and Mikkey Dee, who would later join the band as a permanent member until Lemmy's death. Another drummer, Garry Bowler (a.k.a. Magpie), worked on the drum track for the demo of "Stand" during a 1991 session in London with Würzel and Campbell. In the documentary The Guts and the Glory, Dee – who had earlier been asked to join Motörhead before he elected to join Don Dokken's solo band instead – spoke about replacing the longtime Motörhead member Taylor:

"I had two options: I had to either replace him or join the band. I could not replace him... I had to join the band and do my shit. I had to change the band, I had to play differently, look differently, just be different. Either I got accepted or I didn't. I can overplay these songs. I can do drums all over these songs and show how damn good I am, you know, with a million fuckin' things, but that's not Motörhead. I like to keep it really straight and heavy. Less is a lot more in a band like this."

Ozzy Osbourne duets with Lemmy on the track "I Ain't No Nice Guy", which also features Slash from Guns N' Roses on lead guitar. Slash also performs on the track "You Better Run". Considering that both Osbourne and Guns N' Roses were enjoying immense popularity at the time, "I Ain't No Nice Guy" seemed poised to become a major radio hit, but according to Lemmy's memoir Sony tried to suppress the single because it was utilizing WTG Records as a tax write-off:

"'Ain't No Nice Guy' was actually a radio hit, but that was completely down to us, without any help from Sony, or its marketing department at Epic. 'Ain't No Nice Guy' wound up No. 10 in the radio charts, and Sony didn't make call one – imagine what would have happened if they'd given it just the slightest amount of effort! But no: they actually tried to stop it from being played. All we needed was about fifteen grand or so to shoot a video but they wouldn't let us have it. So we took about $8000 of our own money and made our own – Ozzy and Slash, nice guys that they are, even came down and appeared in it. Although the video's a bit jumbled, it didn't turn out too badly. But MTV didn't play it for a while because Sony took three weeks to sign the release!"

The album includes a cover of the 1977 Ted Nugent classic "Cat Scratch Fever", which was Campbell's idea. The track "Hellraiser", earlier recorded and released by Ozzy Osbourne for his 1991 album No More Tears, appeared in the 1992 movie Hellraiser III: Hell on Earth. The band re-recorded "You Better Run" in 2004 as "You Better Swim" for The SpongeBob SquarePants Movie.

The March ör Die recording sessions took place in Los Angeles and coincided with the eruption of the Rodney King riots in the city. The studio where the band was recording lay in the path of the violence. Lemmy later recalled to Classic Rock Revisited:

"I was doing a vocal and I finished and came into the lounge, and there was a TV on that was showing a house burning. I looked out the window and I saw the other side of the same house! Driving out of there was like driving through a war zone, as the whole city block was on fire. Everything went dark and all you could see was entire city blocks burning. It was fucking great."

== Reception ==
Professional ratings
Review scores
Source	Rating
AllMusic	2/5 stars
Robert Christgau	(1-star Honorable Mention)
Collector's Guide to Heavy Metal	6/10
The Encyclopedia of Popular Music	2/5 stars
Entertainment Weekly	A
Q	3/5 stars
Spin Alternative Record Guide	4/10

Reviews for March ör Die were mixed. The AllMusic review states:

"This is where everything almost went horribly wrong. Encouraged by a new distribution deal through Epic Records and his recent collaboration with old friend Ozzy Osbourne on his wildly successful No More Tears album, Motörhead's Lemmy set out to pursue commercial success like never before and, as a result, almost managed to toss their impeccable legacy in the dumpster."

Entertainment Weekly wrote:

"March or Die surges way beyond the confines of ordinary heavy metal."

== Track listing ==
All lyrics are written by Kilmister; all music is composed by Motörhead, except where noted.

No.	Title	Lyrics	Music	Length
1.	"Stand"			3:31
2.	"Cat Scratch Fever" (Ted Nugent cover)	Nugent	Nugent	3:52
3.	"Bad Religion"			5:01
4.	"Jack the Ripper"			4:39
5.	"I Ain't No Nice Guy" (featuring Ozzy Osbourne & Slash)		Kilmister	4:18
6.	"Hellraiser"		Ozzy Osbourne; Zakk Wylde; Kilmister	4:35
7.	"Asylum Choir"			3:40
8.	"Too Good to Be True"			3:36
9.	"You Better Run" (featuring Slash)		Kilmister	4:51
10.	"Name in Vain"			3:06
11.	"March ör Die"		Kilmister	5:41
Total length:				46:46

== Personnel ==
Credits adapted from the album's liner notes.

- Lemmy – vocals, bass, cello arrangements
- Phil "Zööm" Campbell – rhythm guitar & lead guitar; guitar solo on tracks 1–4 and 9–10
- Michael "Würzel" Burston – lead and rhythm guitar; guitar solo on tracks 2–4 and 6–10
- Phil Taylor – drums on "I Ain't No Nice Guy"

Guest musicians

- Tommy Aldridge - drums on all tracks except "Hellraiser" and "I Ain't No Nice Guy"
- Mikkey Dee – drums on "Hellraiser"
- Peter Solley – keyboard, cello arrangements, production
- Slash – guitar solo on "I Ain't No Nice Guy" and additional guitar on "You Better Run"
- Ozzy Osbourne – vocals on "I Ain't No Nice Guy"
- Jamie Germaine - guitar

Production

- Billy Sherwood – producer ("Hellraiser")
- Casey McMackin – engineer
- Lawrence Ethen – engineer
- Tim Nitz – engineer
- Tom Fletcher – engineer ("Hellraiser")
- Steve Hall – mastering
- Dawn Patrol – art direction
- Merlyn Rosenberg – photography

== Charts ==
Chart (1992)	Peak position
Austrian Albums (Ö3 Austria)	16
Finnish Albums (The Official Finnish Charts)	12
German Albums (Offizielle Top 100)	21
Swedish Albums (Sverigetopplistan)	42
Swiss Albums (Schweizer Hitparade)	18
UK Albums (OCC)	60
