= 1916 (album) =

Studio album by Motörhead
- Released: 21 January 1991
- Recorded: 1990
- Genre: Heavy metal
- Length: 39:28
- Label: WTG
- Producer: Peter Solley, Ed Stasium

Motörhead chronology
Nö Sleep at All (1988)	1916 (1991)	March ör Die (1992)

Singles from 1916
- 1. "The One to Sing the Blues" Released: 24 December 1990

1916 is the ninth studio album by British rock band Motörhead, released in January 1991. It was their first on WTG Records. The single "The One to Sing the Blues" peaked at number 45. The album was the final Motörhead album to feature Phil "Philthy Animal" Taylor on drums in its entirety.

== Background ==
In 1990, Motörhead frontman Lemmy moved from England to the U.S., settling in West Hollywood within walking distance of the Rainbow Bar and Grill. With Phil Carson managing the band, the sessions for what would become the album 1916 began with Ed Stasium, best known for producing the Ramones, Talking Heads, and Living Colour. The band recorded four songs with the producer before deciding he had to go. When Lemmy listened to a mix of "Going to Brazil", he asked him to turn up four tracks, and on doing so heard claves and tambourines Stasium had added without the band's knowledge. Stasium was fired and Peter Solley hired as producer.

== Recording ==
1916 was Motörhead's first studio album in nearly four years, and their first release on WTG after a legal battle with GWR Records was resolved. Some of its songs – including "The One to Sing the Blues", "I'm So Bad (Baby I Don't Care)", "No Voices in the Sky", "Going to Brazil" and "Shut You Down" – were originally performed on Motörhead's 1989 and 1990 tours. The title track – an uncharacteristically slow ballad in which Lemmy's singing is only lightly accompanied – is a tribute to, and reflection on, young soldiers who fell in battle during World War I. In his 2002 memoir, Lemmy reveals that the song was inspired by the Battle of the Somme:

"'Nightmare/The Dreamtime' and '1916' both relied heavily on keyboards, which was very different for Motörhead – or any heavy band in 1990. I wrote the words before the music. It's about the Battle of the Somme in World War I...Nineteen thousand Englishmen were killed before noon, a whole generation destroyed, in three hours – think about that! It was terrible – there were three or four towns in northern Lancashire and south Yorkshire where that whole generation of men were completely wiped out."

Although songs like the ballad "Love Me Forever" and "Angel City" (which includes a saxophone) were stylistic departures for the band, the album still contained Motörhead's ear-splitting brand of rock 'n' roll, including "I'm So Bad (Baby I Don't Care)" and "R.A.M.O.N.E.S", a tribute to punk band the Ramones, by whom it was covered. In the 2002 book Hey Ho Let's Go: The Story of the Ramones, Everett True quotes singer Joey Ramone as saying: "It was the ultimate honour – like John Lennon wrote a song for you."

In the album's liner notes, the band says:

"To the people we left behind – we didn't want to leave ya, but we really had to go! This album is the better for it. Stale and on a treadmill in our career, a change was needed. We decided a change of locale was an idea to try, and we think its done us good musicially, and attitude wise (which is even worse)."

The absence of French, Bulgarian, Russian, Serbian and Portuguese flags from the album artwork was explained as an unintentional oversight. "Love Me Forever" was later covered by Doro Pesch, and Beyond the Black.

The Yugoslavian release of the album on ZKP-RTVL was the final record to be released in Slovenia prior to its independence and the renaming of the label to ZKP-RTVS.

== Critical reception ==
Professional ratings
Review scores
Source	Rating
AllMusic	3/5 stars
Robert Christgau	A−
Classic Rock (reissue review)	9/10
Collector's Guide to Heavy Metal	7/10
Entertainment Weekly	A+
Kerrang!	5/5 stars
Q	4/5 stars
Rolling Stone	3.5/5 stars
Select	4/5 stars

The LP received mostly positive reviews from contemporary critics. Robert Christgau rated it an A−, calling it "sonically retrograde and philosophically advanced." Rolling Stone remarked how the album "..manages to mingle ruthlessness and listenability like never before... creating a new threshold of sharpness for the genre. Fortunately, the crisper approach only makes the cruelty of the group's playing more pronounced." Q also praised the album and wrote that "at 45 the godfather of thrash metal still won't give the old folks a break...Motorhead's ninth studio album is a mad morass of noise, the turbocharged twin guitars of Wurzel and Campbell adding a modern machine sheen to the more primeval approach of Lemmy's shot-blasted vocals." Select reviewer called 1916 "the most cohesive and downright ferocious record to appear under the Motorhead banner since the timeless blast of 'Ace of Spades' in 1980... Motorhead badly needed an album like this, but no one could have guessed they'd do it so convincingly."

In a retrospective review, AllMusic's Alex Henderson wrote that "the band's sound hadn't changed much, and time hadn't made its sledgehammer approach any less appealing... whether the subject matter is humorously fun or more serious, Motörhead is as inspired as ever on 1916." Reviewing a reissue on the Hear No Evil label, Kris Needs wrote in Classic Rock: "One of their most well-rounded sets, this memorabilia-stacked reissue comes with two non-album belters, 'Eagle Rock' and runaway hell train 'Dead Man's Hand'."

In the Motörhead documentary The Guts and the Glory, Lemmy stated:

"That was really the renaissance album for Motörhead, 1916... It got great reviews, which [its predecessor] Rock 'n' Roll didn't."

The album was nominated for Best Metal Performance at the 1992 Grammys, but lost to Metallica's Metallica (The Black Album), released approximately six months after 1916.

== Track listing ==
All tracks are written by Ian Kilmister, Michael Burston, Phil Campbell and Phil Taylor except "Angel City" and "1916," written solely by Kilmister.

No.	Title	Length
1.	"The One to Sing the Blues"	3:08
2.	"I'm So Bad (Baby I Don't Care)"	3:14
3.	"No Voices in the Sky"	4:12
4.	"Going to Brazil"	2:31
5.	"Nightmare / The Dreamtime"	4:42
6.	"Love Me Forever"	5:28
7.	"Angel City"	3:57
8.	"Make My Day"	4:25
9.	"Ramones"	1:26
10.	"Shut You Down"	2:42
11.	"1916"	3:48
Total length:		39:28

Castle Communications 1996 reissue bonus tracks
No.	Title	Length
12.	"Eagle Rock"	3:11
13.	"Dead Man's Hand"	3:31
Total length:		46:15

== Personnel ==
Per the album's liner notes.

- Lemmy – lead vocals, bass
- Phil "Wizzö" Campbell – guitar
- Michael "Würzel" Burston – guitar
- Phil "Philthy Animal" Taylor – drums
- James Hoskins – cello on "1916"

Production

- Peter Solley – producer, mixing
- Ed Stasium – producer ("No Voices in the Sky", "Going To Brazil" and "Love Me Forever")
- Casey McMackin – engineer
- Paul Hemingson – engineer ("No Voices in the Sky", "Going To Brazil" and "Love Me Forever")
- Steve Hall – mastering
- Graig Nelson – album cover
- Toni Hanzon – album cover
- Joe Petagno – Snaggletooth

== Charts ==
Chart (1991)	Peak position
Australian Albums (Kent Music Report)	95
Finnish Albums (The Official Finnish Charts)	11
German Albums (Offizielle Top 100)	14
Swedish Albums (Sverigetopplistan)	23
Swiss Albums (Schweizer Hitparade)	24
UK Albums (Official Charts)	24
US Billboard 200	142
