= Würzel =

British guitarist (1949–2011)

- Würzel with Mötorhead

Background information
- Born: Michael Richard Burston; 23 October 1949; Cheltenham, England
- Died: 9 July 2011 (aged 61)
- Genres: Heavy metal; hard rock; rock and roll; ambient
- Occupation: Musician
- Instrument: Guitar
- Years active: 1983–2011
- Formerly of: Motörhead

Michael Richard Burston (23 October 1949 – 9 July 2011), commonly known by the stage name Würzel, was an English musician who played professionally for three decades. He played guitar in British rock band Motörhead from 1984 to 1995, playing on six studio albums and two live albums. Würzel died at the age of 61, following heart complications.

== Biography ==
Before joining Motörhead in 1984, Würzel had been a corporal in the British Army, serving in Germany and Northern Ireland with the 1st Battalion of the Gloucestershire Regiment, and had played in the bands Bastard and Warfare. In the early 1980s, Würzel played in a Cheltenham-based band, originally named Made in England, then The Meek. He joined another relatively unknown guitarist, Phil Campbell, at a Motörhead audition; both were hired. The new four-piece line-up made its debut recording a backing track for The Young Ones on 14 February 1984. Würzel also played on the Lemmy-produced album for Warfare entitled Metal Anarchy in 1985.

He acquired the nickname 'Würzel' whilst in the Army, being compared to the character Worzel Gummidge owing to his scarecrow-style hair and bumpkin-like manner. Motörhead singer Lemmy encouraged Würzel to add an umlaut to the 'U' in his nickname, for heavy metal effect.

Würzel saw a number of changes to the band's line-up, each involving the drummer, until he left in 1995. Although he played on the album Sacrifice, Würzel left Motörhead before the tour. Instead of replacing him, the band reverted to a three-piece line-up. He later made a few guest appearances with them, at the 2008 Download Festival and at the 2009 Guilfest, as well as a few other appearances on the band's 2008 UK tour.

Würzel recorded his first solo EP, Bess, in 1987; it was not far removed from the Motörhead sound, but also allowed for slightly different ideas. The EP included the instrumental title track, two rock pieces, "Midnight in London" and "People Say I'm Crazy", and an instrumental jazz rock-oriented track, "E.S.P.".

In 1998, inspired by psychedelically-informed experiences in Belgium, Würzel recorded and released an ambient, improvised avant-garde album entitled Chill Out or Die.

== Death ==
On 9 July 2011, Tim Butcher, longtime bass technician of Motörhead leader Lemmy, reported that Würzel had died. The cause of death was ventricular fibrillation triggered by cardiomyopathy. Before he died, Würzel was working on new material with his new band, Leader of Down, who had previously announced the release of their debut single for early 2010. The following day, Lemmy dedicated Motörhead's performance at Sonisphere Festival in Knebworth to his memory.

== Discography ==
With Motörhead

- No Remorse (Compilation, 1984)
- Orgasmatron (1986)
- Rock 'n' Roll (1987)
- Nö Sleep at All (Live album, 1988)
- The Birthday Party (Live album, 1990)
- 1916 (1991)
- March ör Die (1992)
- Bastards (1993)
- Sacrifice (1995)
- BBC Live & In-Session (Live album, 2005)

Solo work

- Bess (1987)
- Chill Out or Die (The Ambient Album) (1998)

Other work and guest appearances

- Warfare – Metal Anarchy (1985)
- V.A. – "Where Would You Rather Be Tonight?" (1986) (All proceeds from this album went to Broadreach House, a rehabilitation centre for drug addicts and alcoholics)
- Atomgods – WOW! (1988)
- Warhead – Warhead (1995)
- Disgust – A World of No Beauty (1996)
- WVKEAF – "Jump/Maximism" – (1997)
- Splodgenessabounds – Artful Splodger (2001)

=== VHS and DVD appearances ===
- Motörhead – The Birthday Party (1985)
- Motörhead – 1916 Live...Everything Louder than Everything Else (VHS & DVD 1991)
- Motörhead – Videobiography (2007) (Würzel is featured on Disc 2 of Motörhead Videobiography, in a 50-minute interview, his first since leaving the band; filmed in early 2007)
- Motorhead The Ultimate Review (Double DVD with different Würzel interview footage to the above on DVD 2), Anvil Media (ANV5096) – July 2013
