= Phil Campbell (musician) =

Welsh guitarist (1961–2026)

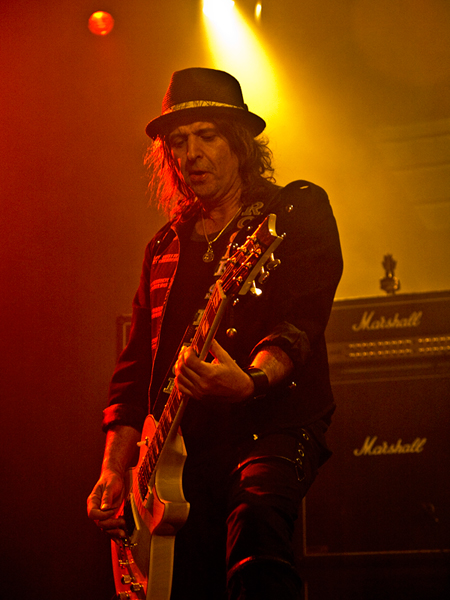
- Campbell performing in 2011

Background information
- Also known as: Wizzö; Zööm; Wizzööm; Lord Axsmith
- Born: Philip Anthony Campbell; 7 May 1961; Pontypridd, Wales
- Died: 13 March 2026 (aged 64) Pontypridd, Wales
- Genres: Heavy metal; hard rock; rock and roll
- Occupation: Musician
- Instrument: Guitar
- Years active: 1979–2026
- Formerly of: Motörhead; Phil Campbell and the Bastard Sons; Persian Risk; Phil Campbell's All Starr Band
- Website: imotorhead.com philcampbell.net

Philip Anthony Campbell (7 May 1961 – 13 March 2026) was a Welsh rock musician, best known as the guitarist in Motörhead from 1984 until its disbandment in 2015 upon the death of founder and frontman Lemmy. He also toured with his own band Phil Campbell and the Bastard Sons, featuring his three sons.

== Early life and career ==
Philip Anthony Campbell was born in Pontypridd on 7 May 1961, and started playing guitar when he was 10-years-old, inspired and influenced by guitarists such as Jimi Hendrix, Black Sabbath's Tony Iommi, Led Zeppelin's Jimmy Page, Jan Akkerman, Michael Schenker and Todd Rundgren. At the age of 12, Campbell met Lemmy after a Hawkwind gig and asked him for an autograph. By the age of 14, Campbell was playing semi-professionally with a cabaret band called Contrast. He later played with a pub-rock band called Roktopus (not to be confused with Rocktopus) at gigs in and around South Wales. He bought his first Les Paul in 1978 at a New Year's Day guitar sale at a shop on Ealing Broadway, London. The guitar was later stolen but returned.

In 1979, Campbell formed the heavy metal band, Persian Risk, playing on their 7" singles, "Calling For You" (1981) and "Ridin' High" (1983). Compilation albums have been issued which feature some of his work with Persian Risk.

== Motörhead ==
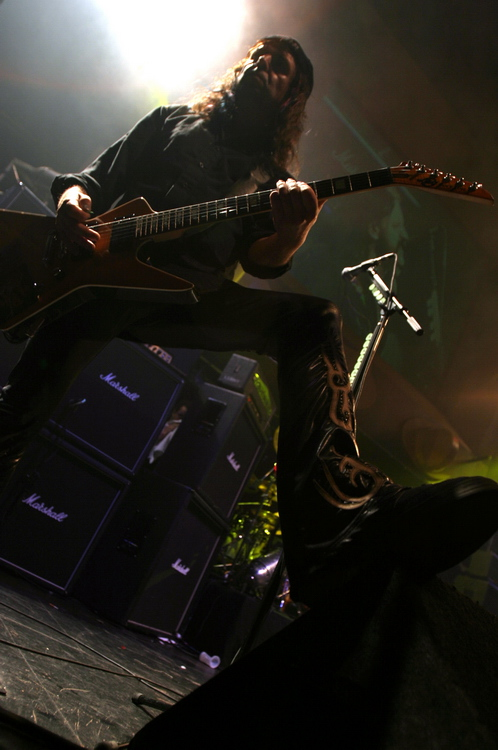
Phil Campbell live at Reds, Edmonton, 2005

On 8 February 1984, following the departure of Brian Robertson, Motörhead held auditions for a new guitarist, narrowing the candidates down to two guitarists: Michael "Würzel" Burston and Philip Campbell. Though Lemmy had first planned on hiring only one guitarist, he hired both Würzel and Campbell upon hearing them play together.

On 14 February 1984, Motörhead were the musical guest for The Young Ones episode "Bambi". One of the band's most popular compilations, No Remorse, followed shortly, it was released on 15 September. Campbell subsequently toured the world with the band and remained a constant member of Motörhead until they disbanded.

On 28 December 2015, band founder and sole constant member Lemmy died. The following day, drummer Mikkey Dee announced that Motörhead had disbanded, stating: "We will not be doing any more tours or anything. And there will not be any more records. But the fire survives, and Lemmy lives on in the hearts of everyone."

In April 2020, Campbell opened up about how hard it was to see Lemmy struggle towards the end of his life saying that Lemmy “wasn’t quite himself” and that he had been “ageing a little bit more” on Motörhead’s final tour. He also admitted that the end of Motörhead was not easy to adjust to at first.

== Debut solo studio album ==
In February 2016, Campbell entered the studio along with former Slipknot percussionist Chris Fehn to record a new solo album.

Campbell's debut solo studio album Old Lions Still Roar was released on 25 October 2019 and features guest vocals from Alice Cooper, Rob Halford, Dee Snider and Benji Webbe.

== Phil Campbell and the Bastard Sons ==
The second Motorhead's Motorboat was a themed five-day cruise from Miami to the Bahamas and featured Phil Campbell's All Starr Band - one of the many support acts to headliners Motorhead, Anthrax and Slayer - who became Phil Campbell And The Bastard Sons.

In November 2016, his new project Phil Campbell and the Bastard Sons released their first recording, a self-titled EP. The band subsequently performed in supporting slots with Guns N' Roses, Hawkwind, Saxon, and Airbourne.

In August 2017, Phil Campbell and the Bastard Sons announced that they were to start recording their debut album. On 26 October 2017, Phil Campbell and the Bastard Sons announced the title of the debut album as The Age of Absurdity, which was released on 26 January 2018 on Nuclear Blast Records. The album was produced by Romesh Dodangoda.

The band's line-up for the inaugural album featured Phil and his three sons, together with former Attack! Attack! vocalist from South Wales Neil Starr. Neil was replaced with vocalist Joel Peters in late 2021.

- Phil Campbell – guitar
- Todd Campbell – guitar/harmonica
- Dane Campbell – drums
- Tyla Campbell – bass
- Joel Peters – vocals
- Romesh Dodangoda – percussion and keyboards on 'Into the Dark'
- Dave Brock – guitar and vocals on 'Silver Machine'

Phil Campbell and the Bastard Sons released a cover of Hawkwind's "Silver Machine" on 21 April 2018 for Record Store Day. The track was previously available as a bonus track on some CD versions of The Age of Absurdity.

The second, We're the Bastards, was released in 2020 again featuring Neil Starr on vocals.

The third, a live album called Live in the North, featuring Joel Peters on vocals, was recorded in Sunderland in 2021 and released in March 2023.

The fourth, Kings of the Asylum, was released on 1 September 2023, supported by three videos in the buildup featuring the tracks "Schizophrenia", "Hammer and Dance" and "Strike the Match", recorded at a special invite-only event in Cardiff.

== Personal life and death ==
=== Family ===
Campbell resided in Pontypridd with his wife, Gaynor, and their children.

=== Death ===
Campbell died suddenly of complications from surgery on 13 March 2026, at the age of 64. His death was announced one day later on a social media post made by the band. He was laid to rest in Wales on 13 May 2026.

== Equipment ==
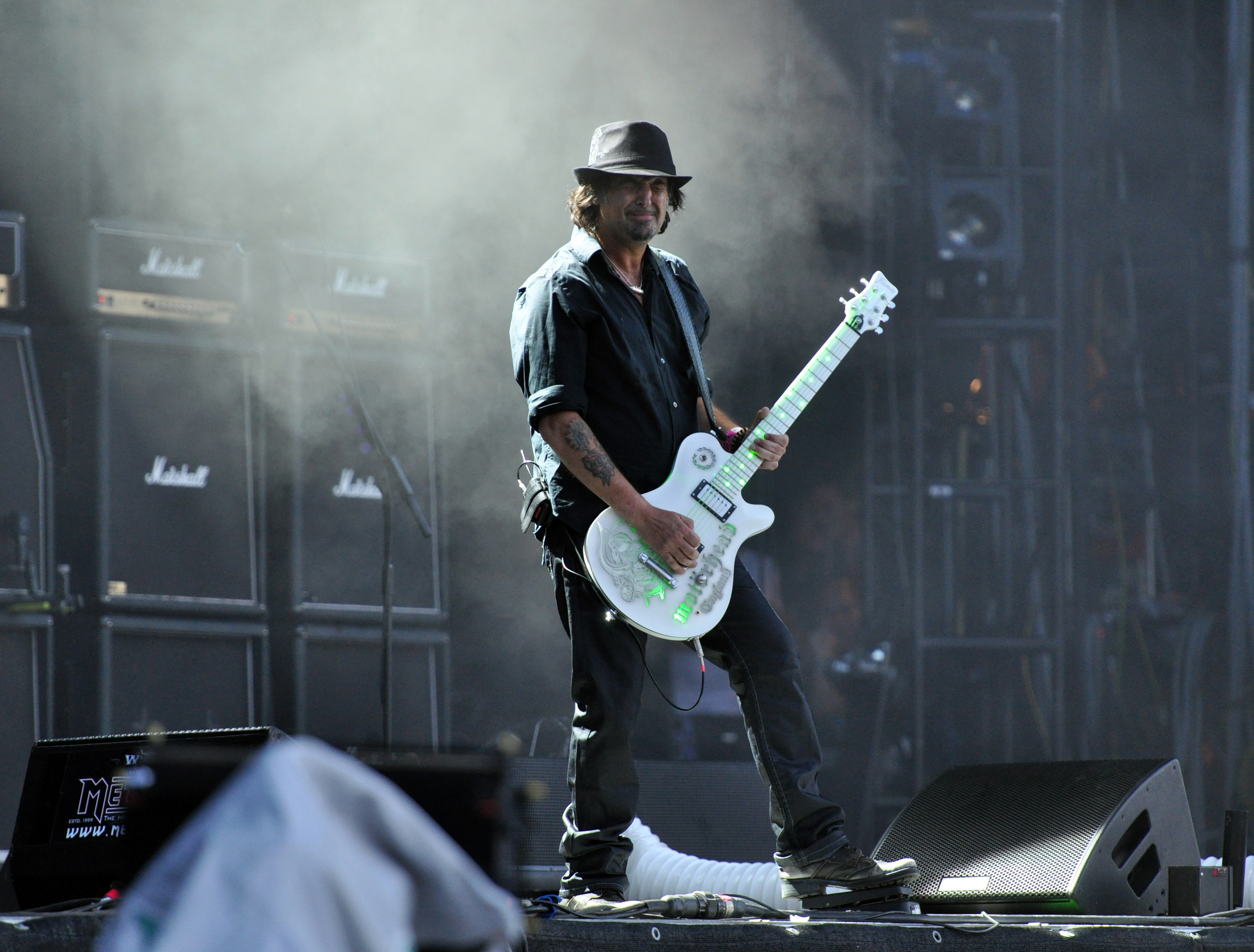
Campbell at Wacken Open Air 2013 with Framus guitar

Campbell used an LAG Explorer Signature model guitar both live and in the studio, fitted with two Seymour Duncan humbuckers and a single (volume) control. He also used DBZ, Charvel, Caparison, a couple of Framus Custom Shop guitars on stage, with an occasional acoustic Dean. He was also known to play ESP, PRS, Minarik Infernos, Tokai Love Rock (Les Paul copies) and a Parker Nitefly guitars.

He also used guitars built by luthier TC Ellis. Ellis built him a Les Paul-styled, a Stratocaster-styled, and one modelled after Lemmy's custom-built Rickenbacker 4004.

Like Lemmy, Campbell used Marshall Amplifiers and Cabinets when playing live, latterly using Marshall JVM410H, JVM410H-JS, JCM 900 4100 and 1959RR heads. In the studio he was known to use Line 6, ENGL, Bogner and Laboga Amps. Earlier in his career he occasionally played Gallien-Krueger amplifiers.

He mainly used Dunlop pedals (Micro Amp, Micro Chorus, Phase 90 (Script or EVH), Carbon Copy, Smart Gate, Slash Octave Fuzz & 95Q wah), strings (10–46) and picks (.88).

== Discography ==
=== with Persian Risk ===
- "Calling for You" b/w "Chase the Dragon" 7" (1981)
- Heavy Metal Heroes Vol.2 compilation (1982)
- 60 Minutes Plus compilation (1982)
- All Hell Let Loose compilation (1983)
- "Ridin' High" b/w "Hurt You" 7" (1983)

=== with Motörhead ===
- Orgasmatron (1986)
- Rock 'n' Roll (1987)
- 1916 (1991)
- March ör Die (1992)
- Bastards (1993)
- Sacrifice (1995)
- Overnight Sensation (1996)
- Snake Bite Love (1998)
- We Are Motörhead (2000)
- Hammered (2002)
- Inferno (2004)
- Kiss of Death (2006)
- Motörizer (2008)
- The Wörld Is Yours (2010)
- Aftershock (2013)
- Bad Magic (2015)

=== with Phil Campbell and the Bastard Sons ===
- Phil Campbell and the Bastard Sons (EP) (2016)
- The Age Of Absurdity (2018)
- We're the Bastards (2020)
- Live in the North (2023)
- Kings of the Asylum (2023)

=== Solo ===
Studio albums:

- Old Lions Still Roar (2019)

=== Guest appearances ===
- Drifter – Nowhere To Hide (1989) lead guitar on "Concrete Jungle" and "We Can't Be Beaten"
- Hawkwind - "Hawkwind 50th Anniversary Live" (2019) guest on "The Watcher" and "Silver Machine"
- Cro-Mags – In the Beginning (2020) lead and slide guitar on "From the Grave"
