= List of King Diamond members =

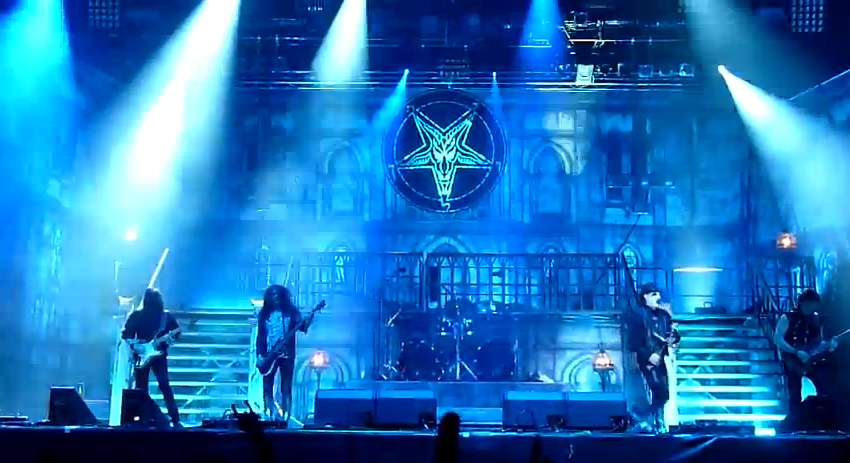
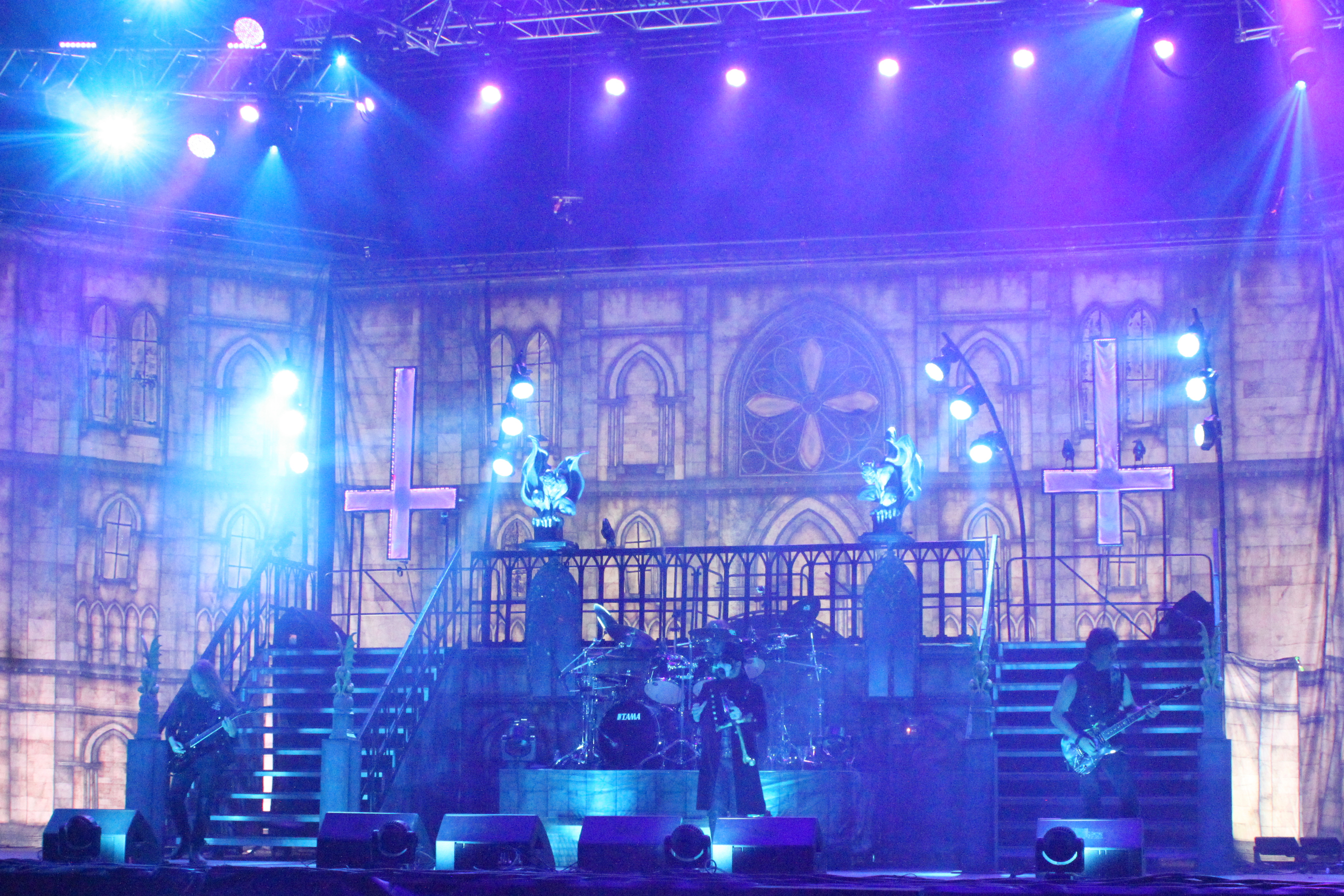
King Diamond performing at Hellfest in 2012 (top) and 2016 (bottom)

King Diamond is a Danish heavy metal band from Copenhagen. Formed in 1985 by vocalist King Diamond, guitarist Michael Denner, and bassist Timi Hansen after the breakup of their former band Mercyful Fate. The first lineup of the group also included guitarist Andy LaRocque and drummer Mikkey Dee. The band currently consists of Diamond and LaRocque alongside guitarist Mike Wead, drummer Matt Thompson (both since 2000) and bassist Pontus Egberg (since 2014).

== History ==
Denner left King Diamond after the release of the band's second album Abigail in 1987, with Mike Moon taking his place for a European tour at the end of the year. Hansen also left after the tour, with Hal Patino joining alongside Moon's replacement Pete Blakk. By the end of the year, Dee had also left King Diamond. Dee was briefly replaced by Chris Whitemeier, before he was asked to return as a session drummer for the recording of Conspiracy the following year. Snowy Shaw joined as Dee's replacement prior to the beginning of touring for the album, shortly after his 21st birthday.

Following the release of The Eye, the band went into a five-year period of silence. The band would reform in 1994, adding guitarist Herb Simonsen, bassist Chris Estes, and drummer Darrin Anthony for the album The Spider's Lullabye, released the following year. Due to injuries suffered in a road traffic accident, Anthony was forced to leave the band shortly after the release of the 1996 follow-up The Graveyard, with John Luke Hebert taking his place. Simonsen left after the release of 1998's Voodoo, with Glen Drover taking his place. Paul David Harbour took over from Estes for 2000's House of God, after which Drover, Harbour, and Hebert all left the band.

Harbour, Drover, and Hebert were replaced by returning Hal Patino, and new additions Mike Wead and Matt Thompson, respectively in 2000. This lineup of the band remained stable for over 13 years and three studio albums, before Patino was fired in July 2014. He was replaced by The Poodles bassist Pontus Egberg.

== Members ==
=== Current ===
Image	Name	Years active	Instruments	Release contributions
	King Diamond (Kim Petersen)	1985–present	vocals; keyboards	all King Diamond releases
	Mike Wead (Mickael Vikström)	2000–present	guitars	all King Diamond releases from Abigail II: The Revenge (2002) onwards
	Matt Thompson	2000–present	drums	all King Diamond releases from Abigail II: The Revenge (2002) onwards
	Pontus Egberg	2014–present	bass	Songs for the Dead Live (2019)
	Gus G	2026–present	guitars	none

=== Former ===
Image	Name	Years active	Instruments	Release contributions
	Andy LaRocque (Anders Allhage)	1985–2026	guitars; keyboards	all King Diamond releases from "No Presents for Christmas" (1985) to "Spider Lilly" (2024)
	Mikkey Dee (Micael Delaoglou)	1985–1988; 1989 (session)	drums	all King Diamond releases from "No Presents for Christmas" (1985) to Conspiracy (1989); In Concert 1987: Abigail (1991)
	Timi Hansen	1985–1987 (died 2019)	bass	"No Presents for Christmas" (1985); Fatal Portrait (1986); Abigail (1987); In Concert 1987: Abigail (1991)
	Michael Denner	1985–1987	guitars	"No Presents for Christmas" (1985); Fatal Portrait (1986); Abigail (1987)
	Mike Moon	1987	guitars	In Concert 1987: Abigail (1991)
	Hal Patino	1988–1990; 2000–2014	bass	Them (1988); Conspiracy (1989); The Eye (1990); all King Diamond releases from Abigail II: The Revenge (2002) to Give Me Your Soul Please (2007)
	Pete Blakk	1988–1990	guitars	Them (1988); Conspiracy (1989); The Eye (1990)
	Chris Whitemeier	1988–1989	drums	none
	Snowy Shaw (Tommie Helgesson)	1989–1990	drums	The Eye (1990)
	Chris Estes	1994–1999	bass; keyboards; acoustic guitar	The Spider's Lullabye (1995); The Graveyard (1996); Voodoo (1998)
	Herb Simonsen	1994–1998	guitars	The Spider's Lullabye (1995); The Graveyard (1996); Voodoo (1998)
	Darrin Anthony	1994–1997	drums	The Spider's Lullabye (1995); The Graveyard (1996)
	John Luke Hebert	1997–2000	drums	Voodoo (1998); House of God (2000)
	Glen Drover	1998–2000	guitars	House of God (2000)
	Paul David Harbour	1999–2000	bass	House of God (2000)

== Line-ups ==
Period	Members	Releases
1985	King Diamond – vocals; Michael Denner – guitars; Timi Hansen – bass	none – rehearsals only
July 1985 – June 1987	King Diamond – vocals; Michael Denner – guitars; Timi Hansen – bass; Andy LaRocque – guitars; Mikkey Dee – drums	Fatal Portrait (1986); Abigail (1987); The Dark Sides (1988)
June – Late 1987	King Diamond – vocals; Timi Hansen – bass; Andy LaRocque – guitars; Mikkey Dee – drums; Mike Moon – guitars	In Concert 1987: Abigail (1991)
Early – Late 1988	King Diamond – vocals, keyboards; Andy LaRocque – guitars; Mikkey Dee – drums; Hal Patino – bass; Pete Blakk – guitars	"Them" (1988); The Dark Sides (1988)
Late 1988 – 1989	King Diamond – vocals, keyboards; Andy LaRocque – guitars; Hal Patino – bass; Pete Blakk – guitars; Chris Whitemeier – drums	none – rehearsals only
1989	King Diamond – vocals, keyboards; Andy LaRocque – guitars; Hal Patino – bass; Pete Blakk – guitars; Mikkey Dee – drums (session)	Conspiracy (1989)
October 1989 – October 1990	King Diamond – vocals, keyboards; Andy LaRocque – guitars; Hal Patino – bass; Pete Blakk – guitars; Snowy Shaw – drums	The Eye (1990)
Band inactive October 1990 – September 1994
September 1994 – September 1996	King Diamond – vocals, keyboards; Andy LaRocque – guitars, keyboards; Herb Simonsen – guitars; Chris Estes – bass; Darrin Anthony – drums	The Spider's Lullabye (1995); The Graveyard (1996)
October 1996 – February 1998	King Diamond – vocals, keyboards; Andy LaRocque – guitars, keyboards; Herb Simonsen – guitars; Chris Estes – bass, keyboards, guitars; John Luke Hebert – drums	Voodoo (1998); Collector's Item (1999)
February 1998 – February 2000	King Diamond – vocals, keyboards; Andy LaRocque – guitars, keyboards; Chris Estes – bass; John Luke Hebert – drums; Glen Drover – guitars	none – live performances only
February – June 2000	King Diamond – vocals, keyboards; Andy LaRocque – guitars, keyboards; John Luke Hebert – drums; Glen Drover – guitars; Paul David Harbour – bass	House of God (2000)
June 2000 – July 2014	King Diamond – vocals, keyboards; Andy LaRocque – guitars, keyboards; Mike Wead – guitars; Hal Patino – bass; Matt Thompson – drums	Abigail II: The Revenge (2002); The Puppet Master (2003); Deadly Lullabyes (2004); Give Me Your Soul...Please (2007)
July 2014 – present	King Diamond – vocals, keyboards; Andy LaRocque – guitars, keyboards; Mike Wead – guitars; Matt Thompson – drums; Pontus Egberg – bass	Songs for the Dead Live (2019); The Institute (TBC)
