= King Diamond discography =

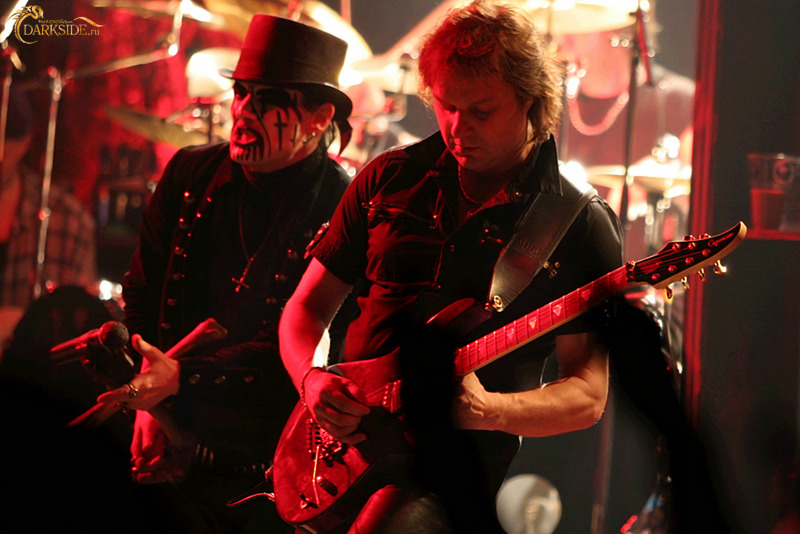
- Vocalist King Diamond and guitarist Andy LaRocque performing in 2006
- Studio albums: 12
- Extended plays: 2
- Live albums: 3
- Compilation albums: 5
- Singles: 5
- Music videos: 4

The discography of King Diamond, a Danish heavy metal band, consists of twelve studio releases, three live albums, five compilations, six singles, and four music videos. King Diamond was formed in 1985, after the dissolution of the group Mercyful Fate, by vocalist King Diamond, guitarists Andy LaRocque and Michael Denner, bassist Timi Hansen, and drummer Mikkey Dee. The following year, the band released their debut album Fatal Portrait on 14 March 1986 which charted at number 33 in Sweden. King Diamond's second studio album, Abigail, was released on 15 June 1987 and reached number 123 in the US, number 39 in Sweden and number 68 in the Netherlands. Following some line-up changes, the group released the album "Them" on 20 June 1988, which peaked at number 38 in Sweden, number 65 in the Netherlands, and at number 89 in the US, making "Them" King Diamond's highest-charting album in North America. The following year, the band released the follow-up album Conspiracy, which charted at number 111 in North America, number 41 in Sweden and at number 64 in the Netherlands. In 1990, after more line-up changes, King Diamond released the album The Eye, which only charted at number 179 in the US, which makes The Eye King Diamond's lowest-charting album in North America.

After Mercyful Fate was reformed in 1993, King Diamond remained inactive until 1995, when the band released the album The Spider's Lullabye with the line-up of King Diamond, Andy LaRocque, guitarist Herb Simonsen, bassist Chris Estes and drummer Darrin Anthony. The album went on to reach number 31 in Finland. The Spider's Lullabye was followed by The Graveyard (number 23 in Finland) and Voodoo (number 27 in Finland, number 55 in the Netherlands) in 1996 and 1998 respectively. In 2000, King Diamond released the album House of God, which peaked at number 60 in Sweden. After the release of 2002's Abigail II: The Revenge, which peaked at number 42 in Sweden and at number 24 in Finland, King Diamond's line-up has remained stable to this day, consisting of King Diamond, Andy LaRocque, bassist Hal Patino, guitarist Mike Wead and drummer Matt Thompson. In 2003, the band released The Puppet Master, which reached number 36 in Sweden. In 2007, King Diamond released their 12th studio album Give Me Your Soul...Please, which peaked at 174 in the US, number 28 in Sweden and at number 25 in Finland.

== Albums ==
=== Studio albums ===
| Year | Album details | Peak chart positions | | | | Sales |
| Year | Album details | US | SWE | FIN | NLD | Sales |
|---|---|---|---|---|---|---|
| 1986 | Fatal Portrait: Released: 14 March 1986; Label: Roadrunner; Format: CD, CS, LP | — | 33 | — | — | |
| 1987 | Abigail: Released: 15 June 1987; Label: Roadrunner; Format: CD, CS, LP | 123 | 19 | — | 68 | US: 175,000 |
| 1988 | Them: Released: 20 June 1988; Label: Roadrunner; Format: CD, CS, LP | 89 | 28 | — | 65 | US: 51,854 |
| 1989 | Conspiracy: Released: 21 August 1989; Label: Roadrunner; Format: CD, CS, LP | 111 | 41 | — | 64 | |
| 1990 | The Eye: Released: 30 October 1990; Label: Roadrunner; Format: CD, CS, LP | 179 | — | — | — | US: 54,793 |
| 1995 | The Spider's Lullabye: Released: 6 June 1995; Label: Metal Blade; Format: CD, CS, LP | — | — | 31 | — | US: 29,224 |
| 1996 | The Graveyard: Released: 1 October 1996; Label: Metal Blade; Format: CD, CS, LP | — | — | 23 | — | |
| 1998 | Voodoo: Released: 24 February 1998; Label: Metal Blade; Format: CD, CS, LP | — | 55 | 27 | — | US: 32,907 |
| 2000 | House of God: Released: 20 June 2000; Label: Metal Blade; Format: CD, CS, LP | — | 60 | — | — | |
| 2002 | Abigail II: The Revenge: Released: 29 January 2002; Label: Metal Blade; Format: CD, CS, LP | — | 42 | 24 | — | US: 13,466 |
| 2003 | The Puppet Master: Released: 21 October 2003; Label: Metal Blade; Format: CD, CS, LP | — | 36 | — | — | |
| 2007 | Give Me Your Soul...Please: Released: 26 June 2007; Label: Metal Blade; Format: CD, LP | 174 | 28 | 25 | — | US: 4,500 |
"—" denotes releases that did not chart or were not released in that country.

=== Live albums ===
| Year | Album details |
|---|---|
| 1991 | In Concert 1987: Abigail: Released: 1991; Label: Roadrunner; Formats: CD, CS, LP |
| 2004 | Deadly Lullabyes: Released: 21 September 2004; Label: Metal Blade; Formats: CD |
| 2019 | Songs for the Dead Live: Released: 25 January 2019; Label: Metal Blade; Formats: CD, LP |

=== Compilation albums ===
| Year | Album details |
|---|---|
| 1992 | A Dangerous Meeting: Released: 6 October 1992; Label: Roadrunner; Format: CD, CS, LP |
| 2001 | Black Rose: 20 Years Ago: Released: 6 February 2001; Label: Metal Blade; Format: CD |
| 2001 | Nightmare in the Nineties: Released: 6 March 2001; Label: Massacre; Format: CD |
| 2003 | The Best of King Diamond: Released: 23 September 2003; Label: Roadrunner; Format: CD |
| 2014 | Dreams of Horror: Released: 11 November 2014; Label: Metal Blade; Format: CD |

== Extended plays ==
| Year | EP details |
|---|---|
| 1988 | The Dark Sides: Released: 1 November 1988; Label: Roadrunner; Formats: CD, CS, LP |
| 1999 | Collector's Item: Released: 1999; Label: Massacre; Formats: CD, LP |

== Singles ==
| Year | Single details | Album |
|---|---|---|
| 1985 | "No Presents for Christmas": Released: 25 December 1985; Label: Roadrunner | Fatal Portrait |
| 1986 | "Halloween": Released: 6 June 1986; Label: Roadrunner | Fatal Portrait |
| 1987 | "The Family Ghost": Released: 1 July 1987; Label: Roadrunner | Abigail |
| 1988 | "Welcome Home": Released: 1988; Label: Roadrunner | "Them" |
| 1988 | "Tea": Released: 1988; Label: Roadrunner | "Them" |
| 1990 | "Eye of the Witch": Released: 1990; Label: Roadrunner | The Eye |
| 2018 | "Halloween (Live)": Released: 2018; Label: Metal Blade | Deadly Lullabyes |
| 2019 | "Masquerade of Madness": Released: 8 November 2019; Label: Metal Blade | |
| 2024 | "Spider Lilly": Released: 17 December 2024; Label: Metal Blade | Saint Lucifer's Hospital 1920 |

== Music videos ==
| Year | Title | Director |
|---|---|---|
| 1987 | "The Family Ghost" | Unknown |
| 1988 | "Welcome Home" | Unknown |
| 1989 | "Sleepless Nights" | Unknown |
| 2008 | "Give Me Your Soul" | Unknown |
| 2023 | "Masquerade of Madness" | Unknown |
| 2024 | "Spider Lilly" | David Brodsky and Allie Woest |
