= The Best of King Diamond =

Greatest hits album by King Diamond
- Released: 23 September 2003
- Genre: Heavy metal
- Length: 75:07
- Label: Roadrunner
- Producer: Andy LaRocque, King Diamond, Rune Hoyer

King Diamond chronology
Black Rose: 20 Years Ago (2001)	The Best of King Diamond (2003)

Professional ratings
Review scores
Source	Rating
AllMusic	4.5/5 stars

The Best of King Diamond is a compilation album by the heavy metal band King Diamond.

== Track listing ==
1. "The Candle" – 6:42
2. "Charon" – 4:17
3. "Halloween" – 4:15
4. "No Presents for Christmas" – 4:22
5. "Arrival" – 5:26
6. "A Mansion in Darkness" – 4:35
7. "The Family Ghost" – 4:08
8. "Abigail" – 4:52
9. "Welcome Home" – 4:37
10. "The Invisible Guests" – 5:04
11. "Tea" – 5:15
12. "At the Graves" – 8:57
13. "Sleepless Nights" – 5:05
14. "Eye of the Witch" – 3:48
15. "Burn" – 3:44

== Personnel ==
- King Diamond - vocals, keyboards
- Andy LaRocque - guitars
- Michael Denner - guitars
- Pete Blakk - guitars
- Timi Hansen - bass
- Hal Patino - bass
- Mikkey Dee - drums
- Snowy Shaw - drums
