= A Dangerous Meeting =

Greatest hits album by King Diamond
- Released: 10 June 1992
- Genre: Heavy metal
- Length: 77:47
- Label: Roadrunner
- Producer: King Diamond

King Diamond chronology
In Concert 1987: Abigail (1991)	A Dangerous Meeting (1992)	The Spider's Lullabye (1995)

Professional ratings
Review scores
Source	Rating
AllMusic	2.5/5 stars
Collector's Guide to Heavy Metal	8/10

A Dangerous Meeting is the first compilation album of King Diamond songs, put out by Roadrunner Records. It also includes older Mercyful Fate songs, recorded during 1982–1984.

== Track listing ==
No.	Title	Writer(s)	Length
1.	"Doomed by the Living Dead"	King Diamond, Hank Shermann	5:08
2.	"A Corpse Without Soul"	Diamond, Shermann	6:56
3.	"Evil"	Diamond, Shermann	4:45
4.	"Curse of the Pharaohs"	Diamond, Shermann	3:58
5.	"A Dangerous Meeting"	Shermann	5:11
6.	"Gypsy"	Michael Denner, Diamond	3:08
7.	"Come to the Sabbath"	Diamond	5:18
8.	"The Candle"	Diamond	6:42
9.	"Charon"	Denner, Diamond	4:17
10.	"Halloween"	Denner, Diamond	4:14
11.	"No Presents for Christmas"	Denner, Diamond	4:21
12.	"Arrival"	Diamond	5:28
13.	"Abigail"	Diamond	4:51
14.	"Welcome Home"	Diamond	4:37
15.	"Sleepless Nights"	Diamond, Andy LaRocque	5:04
16.	"Eye of the Witch"	Diamond	3:49

== Credits ==
- King Diamond – vocals (all tracks)
- Hank Shermann – lead guitar (tracks 1–7)
- Andy LaRocque – lead guitar (tracks 8–16)
- Michael Denner – lead guitar (tracks 1–13)
- Pete Blakk – lead guitar (tracks 14–16)
- Timi Hansen – bass guitar (tracks 1–13)
- Hal Patino – bass guitar (tracks 14–16)
- Kim Ruzz – drums (tracks 1–7)
- Mikkey Dee – drums (tracks 8–15)
- Snowy Shaw – drums (Track 16)
