= The Dark Sides =

EP by King Diamond
- Released: 1 November 1988
- Genre: Heavy metal
- Length: 20:47
- Label: Roadrunner
- Producer: King Diamond

King Diamond chronology
Them (1988)	The Dark Sides (1988)	Conspiracy (1989)

Professional ratings
Review scores
Source	Rating
Allmusic	3/5 stars

The Dark Sides is a compilation of King Diamond songs, released on 1 November 1988 through Roadrunner Records. This album contains five tracks (and an outro), released on previous albums, but are mostly unrelated in their stories (as King's albums were concept albums).

== Controversy ==
The album cover featured King Diamond with face paint that resembled Kiss bassist Gene Simmons' "Demon". Simmons claimed that King's face paint was copyright infringement and sued him. The lawsuit was eventually dropped when King changed his design.

== Track listing ==
1. "Halloween" – 4:14 (previously released on Fatal Portrait)
2. "Them" – 1:58 (instrumental track, previously released on Them)
3. "No Presents for Christmas" – 4:21 (previously released as the A-side of No Presents for Christmas single; later as a bonus track on the 2007 remastered version of Fatal Portrait)
4. "Shrine" – 4:23 (previously released as the b-side of The Family Ghost single; later as a bonus track on the 2007 remastered version of Abigail)
5. "The Lake" – 4:13 (previously released as a b-side of Halloween single and as a bonus track on CD versions of Fatal Portrait)
6. "Phone Call" – 1:38 (previously released on CD versions of Them)

== Personnel ==
- King Diamond – vocals
- Andy LaRocque – guitars
- Michael Denner – guitars
- Pete Blakk – guitars
- Timi Hansen – bass
- Hal Patino – bass
- Mikkey Dee – drums
