= Coerced Existence =

Swedish melodic death metal band

- Origin: Linköping, Sweden
- Genres: Melodic death metal
- Years active: 2005-2012
- Labels: Record Union
- Past members: Ted Abrahamsson; Håkan Abrahamsson; Niklas Johansson; Robin Gunnarsson; Martin Pettersson; Thomas Martinsson; Niclas Löfgren; Daniel Frank; Fredrik Karlsson; Kristoffer "Angus" Norder; Rasmus Cronstrand
- Website: www.coercedexistence.com

Coerced Existence was a melodic death metal band from Linköping, Sweden. The band was first created by lead singer Ted Abrahamsson in the autumn of 2005. Over the years, they went through some line-up changes and name changes. Coerced Existence officially split up after playing their farewell show on August 23, 2012.

They had been the opening act for Sabaton, among others and have recorded a two-track demo at Sonic Tran Studios, owned and operated by Andy LaRocque and on September 23, 2011, the band released their only full–length album "The Rite" and on October 26, 2013, an EP called "Sinners" was released with three songs recorded in January 2012.

Coerced Existence were influenced by Judas Priest, Iron Maiden, Mercyful Fate, King Diamond, Arch Enemy, In Flames and Pain among others.

== Members ==
- Ted Abrahamsson - Lead vocals (2005–2012)
- Håkan Abrahamsson - Lead & rhythm guitar, bass and drums previously (2006–2012)
- Niklas Johansson - Bass (2010–2012)
- Robin Gunnarsson - Drums (2007–2012)
- Martin Pettersson - Lead & rhythm guitar (2006–2011)
- Thomas Martinsson - Lead & rhythm guitar (2009–2010)
- Niclas Löfgren - Lead & rhythm guitar (2008–2009)
- Fredrik Karlsson - Bass (2006–2007)
- Daniel Frank - Lead & rhythm guitar (2005–2008)
- Kristoffer "Angus" Norder - Lead & rhythm guitar (2005–2006)
- Rasmus Cronstrand - Bass (2005–2006)
