= Nightmare in the Nineties =

Nightmares in the Nineties

Compilation album by King Diamond
- Released: 6 March 2001
- Genre: Heavy metal
- Length: 62:29
- Label: Massacre
- Producer: King Diamond

King Diamond chronology
House of God (2000)	Nightmares in the Nineties (2001)	Abigail II: The Revenge (2002)

Nightmares in the Nineties is a compilation album by the heavy metal band King Diamond. It was released on 6 March 2001 through Massacre Records only in Germany.

== Track listing ==
1. "From the Other Side" – 3:49
2. "Waiting" – 4:27
3. "The Exorcist" – 4:51
4. "Eastmann's Cure" – 4:32
5. "Just a Shadow" – 4:37
6. "Cross of Baron Samedi" – 4:30
7. "Trick or Treat" – 5:10
8. "One Down Two to Go" – 3:46
9. "Catacomb" – 5:02
10. "Six Feet Under" – 4:00
11. "Lucy Forever" – 4:55
12. "The Trees Have Eyes" – 4:47
13. "LOA House" – 5:33
14. "Peace of Mind" – 2:30
- Tracks 1, 4 & 10 from The Spider's Lullabye (1995)
- Tracks 2, 7 & 11 from The Graveyard (1996)
- Tracks 3, 6, 8 & 13 from Voodoo (1998)
- Tracks 5, 9, 12 & 14 from House of God (2000)
