= Lex Legion =

Scandinavian heavy metal supergroup

- Origin: Sweden
- Genres: Heavy metal
- Years active: 2026–present
- Label: MNRK Music Group
- Spinoff of: King Diamond
- Members: Nils K. Rue; Andy LaRocque; Pete Blakk; Hal Patino; Mikkey Dee

Lex Legion is a Swedish heavy metal supergroup formed in 2026. The band consists of vocalist Nils K. Rue, guitarists Andy LaRocque and Pete Blakk, bassist Hal Patino, and drummer Mikkey Dee. All members except for Rue previously performed together in the late-1980s lineup of King Diamond. The band's debut album, Lex Legion, was released through MNRK Music Group in 2026.

== History ==
Lex Legion was formed by Mikkey Dee and Pete Blakk, who discussed recording together again following their years in King Diamond. The project later expanded to include Andy LaRocque and Hal Patino, thus reuniting four-fifths of King Diamond's classic late-1980s lineup, with vocalist Nils K. Rue of Pagan's Mind completing the lineup.

The band was publicly announced in March 2026. Its debut single, "Sleep Eternally", was released shortly afterward. The band's debut album Lex Legion was subsequently released that June through MNRK Music Group.

In May 2026, the band announced its first live performance in Gothenburg, Sweden, originally scheduled to take place on November 28. The show was later moved to December 11.

== Musical style ==
Lex Legion's music has been described as traditional heavy metal with elements of melodic and progressive metal.

Critics have noted similarities to the classic works of King Diamond while also highlighting influences from bands such as Iron Maiden and Queensrÿche.

== Reception ==
The band's self-titled debut album received generally positive reviews from music critics. Dom Lawson of Blabbermouth.net awarded the album 8.5 out of 10 and praised its songwriting, musicianship and production, describing it as a successful collaboration between veteran heavy metal musicians. Matti Riekki of Chaoszine described Lex Legion as "a supergroup that actually sounds like one", praising the chemistry between the musicians and the strength of the material. Positive reviews were also published by Sonic Perspectives, metal.de and Twilight Magazin, with critics praising the band's musicianship, songwriting and performances.

== Members ==
- Nils K. Rue – vocals
- Andy LaRocque – guitars
- Pete Blakk – guitars
- Hal Patino – bass
- Mikkey Dee – drums

== Discography ==
=== Studio albums ===
- Lex Legion (2026)

=== Singles ===
- "Sleep Eternally" (2026)
- "Gypsy Tears" (2026)
