= Livia Zita =

- Also known as: Livia Zita-Bendix, Livia Zita
- Born: Lívia Zita Lókay; 21 December 1984 (age 41); Budapest, Hungary
- Genres: Heavy metal
- Occupations: Musician, artist, voice actress, graphic designer
- Instrument: Vocals
- Years active: 2003–present
- Labels: Roadrunner, Metal Blade
- Member of: King Diamond, Mercyful Fate

Livia Zita (born Lívia Zita Lókay on 21 December 1984 in Budapest, Hungary) is a Hungarian voiceover actress and rock singer, best known for her work with the Danish heavy metal band King Diamond, with which she has performed as a guest musician in studio recordings and as a backing vocalist in live performances since 2003.

== Biography ==
Thanks to her marriage with King Diamond (Kim Bendix Petersen), Livia has also contributed to Diamond's band Mercyful Fate. She lives with her husband in Dallas, Texas, USA, and she's an American citizen, under her married name Livia Zita-Bendix Lokay.

She's also his business partner, and is working with him to compile old footage for two planned DVD releases of King Diamond and Mercyful Fate live performances. She also helped him make remastered editions of the King Diamond albums The Spider's Lullabye, The Graveyard, Voodoo and House of God.

Among her personal projects are voice acting, the design of 3D art and artistic photographs, as well as working with clay, resin, cooked goods, and many more media.

She is also very health conscious, practicing yoga and contortion.

In 2017, Zita and King Diamond had their first son, Byron.

== Discography ==
=== With King Diamond ===
- The Puppet Master - (2003)
- Deadly Lullabyes - (Live Album, 2004)
- Give Me Your Soul...Please - (2007)
- Dreams of Horror - (Compilation album, 2014)

=== With Mercyful Fate ===
- Evil (Single) - (2009)
