= In Concert 1987: Abigail =

Live album by King Diamond
- Released: 1991
- Recorded: 1987
- Venue: Various venues during the Abigail tour
- Genre: Heavy metal
- Length: 52:52
- Label: Roadrunner
- Producer: King Diamond, Roberto Falcao

King Diamond chronology
The Eye (1990)	In Concert 1987: Abigail (1991)	A Dangerous Meeting (1992)

Professional ratings
Review scores
Source	Rating
AllMusic	2/5 stars
Collector's Guide to Heavy Metal	7/10

In Concert 1987: Abigail is a live album by Danish heavy metal band King Diamond which was recorded in 1987, but released in 1991 through Roadrunner Records.

== Track listing ==
All songs written by King Diamond unless otherwise noted.

1. "Funeral" – 1:55
2. "Arrival" – 5:47
3. "Come to the Sabbath" – 5:43
4. "The Family Ghost" – 4:25
5. "The 7th Day of July 1777" (Andy LaRocque, Diamond) – 4:26
6. "The Portrait" – 4:46
7. "Guitar Solo Andy" (LaRocque) – 3:35
8. "The Possession" (Michael Denner, Diamond) – 3:52
9. "Abigail" – 4:28
10. "Drum Solo" (Mikkey Dee) – 3:25
11. "The Candle" – 6:01
12. "No Presents for Christmas" (Denner, Diamond) – 4:23

== Personnel ==
- King Diamond – vocals
- Andy LaRocque – guitars
- Mike Moon – guitars
- Timi Hansen – bass
- Mikkey Dee – drums
