= Deadly Lullabyes =

Deadly Lullabyes Live

Live album by King Diamond
- Released: 21 September 2004
- Recorded: Various dates on King Diamond's 2003 North American tour
- Genre: Heavy metal
- Length: 90:02
- Label: Massacre
- Producer: Andy LaRocque, King Diamond

King Diamond chronology
The Puppet Master (2003)	Deadly Lullabyes Live (2004)	Give Me Your Soul...Please (2007)

Deadly Lullabyes Live is the second live album by Danish heavy metal band King Diamond, released on 21 September 2004 through Massacre Records. It was recorded during The Puppet Master promotion tour. It spans two discs. The album features only recordings from the United States part of the tour.

== Track listing ==
=== Disc one ===
1. "Funeral"
2. "A Mansion in Darkness"
3. "The Family Ghost"
4. "Black Horsemen"
5. "Spare This Life"
6. "Mansion in Sorrow"
7. "Spirits"
8. "Sorry Dear"
9. "Eye of the Witch"
10. "Sleepless Nights"

=== Disc two ===
1. "The Puppet Master"
2. "Blood to Walk"
3. "So Sad"
4. "Living Dead"
5. "Welcome Home"
6. "The Invisible Guests"
7. "Burn"
8. ""Introductions""
9. "Halloween"
10. "No Presents for Christmas"

== Personnel ==
=== Band ===
- King Diamond – vocals
- Andy LaRocque – guitars
- Mike Wead – guitars
- Hal Patino – bass
- Matt Thompson – drums

=== Additional musician ===
- Livia Zita – additional vocals

=== Production ===
- Øystein Wierli – live sound
- Jodi Cachia – actress
