= Mike Moon (musician) =

Swedish musician

Mike Moon is the stage name of Mikael Myllynen, born 1968, a guitar player from Sweden. He is most well known for his guitar work while in the King Diamond band.

Before joining King Diamond in 1987 at age 19, Mike was in the Swedish band Madison from 1984–1986, which also featured Göran Edman (of Yngwie Malmsteen and John Norum fame). Moon was part of King Diamond during the Abigail Tour through the USA and Europe, but he was replaced by Pete Blakk after the tour ended.

He owns an entertainment company in Frölunda, Sweden called MoonVision.
