= Abigail II: The Revenge =

Studio album by King Diamond
- Released: 29 January 2002
- Recorded: May–August 2001
- Genre: Heavy metal
- Length: 53:03
- Label: Metal Blade
- Producer: King Diamond

King Diamond chronology
Nightmare in the Nineties (2001)	Abigail II: The Revenge (2002)	The Puppet Master (2003)

Professional ratings
Review scores
Source	Rating
Allmusic	2.5/5 stars
Metal-Rules	4.5/5 stars

Abigail II: The Revenge is the tenth studio album by Danish heavy metal band King Diamond, released on 29 January 2002, and is plotwise a successor to the 1987 album Abigail. Abigail II: The Revenge is the first album to feature guitarist Mike Wead, drummer Matt Thompson, and the first to feature bassist Hal Patino since The Eye.

The cover art was done by Travis Smith.

According to the liner notes, the character of Brandon Henry is based on King's friend, Brandon J. Henry, who looks after King's house when he is on the road.

== Plot ==
The plot correlates with that of the original Abigail, and the listener discovers that she is actually the half-sister of O'Brian (the mysterious leader of the Black Horsemen from the original album), and is kept alive by his intervention (the Horsemen having originally planned to nail her into a coffin with silver spikes to prevent her emerging again). The year is 1863, and Abigail has just turned 18 years old. While out walking in the forest, she is caught in a storm that takes her by surprise, causing her to lose her way and stumble upon the LaFey Mansion, the gates to which are locked tight. Certain that she will succumb to the elements, Abigail is surprised to see "Little One", the ghost of the original Abigail from 1777, unlock the gates and disappear into the house. Abigail enters the mansion and is greeted by Jonathan's imposing and shaven-headed servant, Brandon Henry. It is revealed that Jonathan did not die after he fell down the stairs, but uses a wheelchair part-time and must walk with a cane. He has not moved on from Miriam's death and now calls himself Count de LaFey. He greets Abigail, calling her Miriam and believing she is his beloved, who died while giving birth to Abigail. He coaxes Abigail into sleeping with him in his bed, where he rapes her in an attempt to "produce an heir". Abigail, fueled with vengeance, goes to the crypt to see her past incarnation. Brandon Henry, who had warned her to never go into the crypt, finds her there; Abigail takes a sharp necklace from the mummified baby's neck (the same one from The Eye) and slits his throat. She puts broken glass in Jonathan's food, beats him with his cane while he chokes on his own blood, and then sets him on fire, the flames finally killing him. The fire spreads from Jonathan to the window-curtains and finally to Abigail's dress, and she and the mansion are consumed by the flames. As the fire cannot reach the basement, and is therefore unable to destroy the crypt, the spirit of Little One is unable to pass on and is bound forever to the world of the living, crying out for her mother.

== Track listing ==
All music is composed by King Diamond, except where noted.

No.	Title	Writer(s)	Length
1.	"Spare This Life"		1:44
2.	"The Storm"		4:22
3.	"Mansion in Sorrow"	King Diamond, Andy LaRocque	3:36
4.	"Miriam"		5:10
5.	"Little One"		4:31
6.	"Slippery Stairs"	King Diamond, Andy LaRocque	5:10
7.	"The Crypt"		4:11
8.	"Broken Glass"		4:13
9.	"More Than Pain"		2:31
10.	"The Wheelchair"		5:19
11.	"Spirits"	King Diamond, Andy LaRocque	4:57
12.	"Mommy"		6:26
13.	"Sorry Dear"		0:54

== Charts ==
Chart performance for Abigail II: The Revenge
Chart (2002)	Peak position
Finnish Albums (Suomen virallinen lista)	24
Swedish Albums (Sverigetopplistan)	42

== Personnel ==
- King Diamond – vocals, keyboards
- Andy LaRocque – guitars, keyboards
- Mike Wead – guitars
- Hal Patino – bass
- Matt Thompson – drums
- Kol Marshall – additional keyboards, strings and harpsichord
- Alyssa Biesenberger – voice of "Little One"
