= Fatal Portrait =

Studio album by King Diamond
- Released: 14 March 1986
- Recorded: July–August 1985
- Studio: Sound Track Studio, Copenhagen, Denmark
- Genre: Heavy metal
- Length: 41:41
- Label: Roadrunner
- Producer: King Diamond, Rune Höyer, Michael Denner

King Diamond chronology
Fatal Portrait (1986)	Abigail (1987)

Singles from Fatal Portrait
- 1. "No Presents for Christmas" Released: 1985; 2. "Halloween" Released: 1986

Professional ratings
Review scores
Source	Rating
AllMusic	3/5 stars
Collector's Guide to Heavy Metal	8/10

Fatal Portrait is the debut album by Danish heavy metal band King Diamond. It was produced by Rune Hoyer and released on 14 March 1986 through Roadrunner Records. Guitarist Andy LaRocque joined the album recording sessions at the last minute, as the band's second guitarist at the time "wasn't working out" in the studio. As a result, it is the only King Diamond album which does not feature any writing credits from LaRocque. Recording a solo for "Dressed in White" functioned as his audition for joining the band. Along with The Spider's Lullabye, it is one of the band's only albums which is not a whole concept album.

Fatal Portrait has sold over 100,000 copies in North America alone. The title of the album comes from The Picture of Dorian Gray by Oscar Wilde. Wilde describes the painting as "the fatal portrait" several times throughout the novel.

== Plot ==
Five songs on this album (first four and "Haunted") form a short story. The narrator sees a face in "every candle that [he] burns". The face speaks one word to him: "Jonah". So he finds an old book, speaks a rhyme and frees the spirit from the candle. It's the spirit of a little girl named Molly, who tells him the story of what happened to her seven years before. Mrs. Jane kept her 4-year-old daughter Molly in the attic until she (Molly) died. Before that, Mrs. Jane painted Molly's portrait and put it above the fireplace, so that Molly would become immortal; however, Molly made the portrait speak to her mother, so that Jane would know about Molly's pain. Mrs. Jane then speaks a rhyme and burns the portrait. The free spirit of Molly returns to haunt her until she goes insane.

== Track listing ==
All lyrics are written by King Diamond; all music is composed by King Diamond except where noted.

Side one
No.	Title	Length
1.	"The Candle"	6:38
2.	"The Jonah"	5:15
3.	"The Portrait"	5:06
4.	"Dressed in White"	3:09

Side two
No.	Title	Music	Length
5.	"Charon"	Diamond, Michael Denner	4:14
6.	"Lurking in the Dark"		3:33
7.	"Halloween"	Diamond, Denner	4:12
8.	"Voices from the Past" (instrumental)		1:29
9.	"Haunted"	Diamond, Denner	3:54

Remastered edition bonus tracks
No.	Title	Music	Length
10.	"No Presents for Christmas"	Diamond, Denner	4:20
11.	"The Lake"		4:11

== Personnel ==
Band members

- King Diamond – vocals, guitars on "Voices from the Past"
- Andy LaRocque – guitars
- Michael Denner – guitars
- Timi Hansen – bass
- Mikkey Dee – drums

Production

- King Diamond – production
- Rune Höyer – production
- Michael Denner – assistant production
- Roberto Falcao – engineering
