= The Puppet Master (album) =

Studio album by King Diamond
- Released: 21 October 2003
- Genre: Heavy metal
- Length: 55:50
- Label: Massacre
- Producer: King Diamond

King Diamond chronology
Abigail II: The Revenge (2002)	The Puppet Master (2003)	Deadly Lullabyes: Live (2004)

Professional ratings
Review scores
Source	Rating
Allmusic	3/5 stars

The Puppet Master is the eleventh studio album by Danish heavy metal band King Diamond, released on 21 October 2003. A limited edition includes a DVD on which frontman King Diamond tells the story of the Puppet Master. It is a concept album with a storyline telling the tale of a young couple who go to watch a puppet show in Budapest in the 1700s, and end up being turned into undead puppets by the Puppet Master and his wife.

== Plot ==
The album opens at the end of the story, with the narrator giving a monologue as he is "hanging" from a wall, snow falling in the night outside. He reminisces about his life before his current predicament, giving small hints as to the horrors he was forced to witness and be subjected to ("Midnight").

The story shifts back eighteen years prior, to a nighttime puppet show in Budapest during Christmas. This particular puppet show is well known for both its life-sized, "grotesque" puppets, and the Puppet Master's inexplicable ability to make them dance without strings in the show's finale. The narrator, one of the audience members, is disturbed by the thought that one of the puppets, the Little Drummer Boy, looked at him as though it were "alive." He also notices the puppet is bleeding ("The Puppet Master").

At the conclusion of the show, the narrator meets Victoria, a young lady who shares his sentiments about the puppet show. The two feel that the show was "magic," which the narrator claims to also see in Victoria's eyes. The two talk and learn more about one another, culminating in the narrator kissing her. The couple begins a life together. However, a year later Victoria fails to return home after going to see another puppet show, and the fearful narrator sets out in the night to find her ("Magic").

In his search for Victoria, the narrator notices Emerencia, the Puppet Master's obese wife, emerge from the theater's cellar with a knife, a sack and a cart. Curious, he follows her. To his horror he witnesses Emerencia brutally murder a homeless man, taking his body back with her to the theater. She is careful not to let any blood spill from the corpse, keeping the knife inside her victim's body. Noticing that the door has remained open, the narrator attempts to follow Emerencia down into the cellar but is knocked unconscious by an unseen assailant ("Emerencia").

The narrator awakens on the floor of the cellar, tied up and surrounded by puppets. His eyes adjusting to the dark, he comes to the realization that the puppets are indeed made from human bodies. Upon scrutinizing one of them, he is devastated to find that one of the puppets has the exact same blue eyes as his beloved Victoria, confirming his worst fears ("Blue Eyes").

The Puppet Master and Emerencia then enter the cellar and begin performing a demonic ritual to convert the narrator into another puppet. First, the Puppet Master speaks an incantation to subdue the narrator's mind, but the frightened narrator "kicks" a shelf, knocking down and breaking a jar, the contents of which are revealed to be human blood. This infuriates the Puppet Master, but the ritual continues. The narrator's soul is taken from him, while his eyes are given "eternal life" due to his untimely breaking of the blood-filled jar ("The Ritual").

He then finds himself strapped to a hospital bed for the second and final part of the ritual. The Puppet Master and his wife stand in front of him with a scalpel. The Puppet Master leans over him and says: "First your eyes... then your skin... we will make you feel born again," and starts to cut out his eyes. The Puppet Master uses an instrument to pull the eyeballs out of their sockets, cutting through the nerves holding the eyes in place. The Puppet Master then puts the eyeballs into a puppet's eye sockets, completing the work. The new puppet is placed on a shelf with the others, while the rest of the narrator's body is disposed of ("No More Me").

The narrator, in his new puppet form, can see and feel, but is otherwise unable to move and cannot sleep. He and Victoria, who is placed on a shelf across from him, can still "communicate with [their] eyes," questioning why they were subjected to this horror. The couple are given injections of blood, which gives them mobility under the Puppet Master's direction, who affectionately refers to them as his "children." After the injections successfully reanimate them for the first time, they are put back on their shelves in the cellar ("Blood to Walk").

The Puppet Master continues to train the narrator and Victoria for his upcoming puppet shows. The injections of blood last a maximum of an hour before their effects wear off; the narrator describes the hellish process as an unending cycle of living and dying, over and over. One night, the Puppet Master decides to try to have Victoria dance without strings, in spite of her fearful protests. As a result, Victoria knocks into the shelves of blood and breaks six of the jars. As punishment, the Puppet Master declares that she must be sent away to another puppet theater in Berlin ("Darkness").

The narrator is heartbroken, knowing he will lose Victoria again and is helpless to prevent it. The two converse for the final time as the narrator comforts her. In desperation, the narrator vows to find Victoria, and if he fails, he will be reunited with her in death. The couple declares their love for one another and they tearfully bid each other goodbye ("So Sad (Ghost's Song)").

The Puppet Master puts on his annual Christmas show, with the narrator starring as the new Little Drummer Boy. Without Victoria, the narrator is melancholic and desperate to escape his fate, even as he is forced to perform. In retaliation, he deliberately falls on the stage, breaking his drum and likely ruining the entire show ("Christmas").

Due to his actions during the Christmas performance, the narrator is sold to another shop, where his puppet body is pinned to the wall, a nail driven through its throat. The story returns to the present time, as the narrator describes how, in the eighteen years since he was sold, a rumor has spread that the Puppet Master's son and daughter will be opening a new puppet theater for children, describing how it will "be a bloody mess." The narrator's appearance frightens those who enter the shop, as they sense something amiss with him and notice his eyes following them. The album and story end as the narrator admits he has never found his beloved Victoria, sadly wondering where she is. Unknown to him, Victoria is heard wondering where he may be as well ("Living Dead").

== Track listing ==
No.	Title	Writer(s)	Length
1.	"Midnight"	King Diamond	1:55
2.	"The Puppet Master"	King Diamond	4:41
3.	"Magic"	King Diamond, Andy LaRocque	4:57
4.	"Emerencia"	King Diamond	5:19
5.	"Blue Eyes"	King Diamond	4:24
6.	"The Ritual"	King Diamond, Andy LaRocque	5:02
7.	"No More Me"	King Diamond, Matt Thompson	3:16
8.	"Blood to Walk"	King Diamond	5:32
9.	"Darkness"	King Diamond, Andy LaRocque	4:37
10.	"So Sad"	King Diamond	4:38
11.	"Christmas"	King Diamond	5:18
12.	"Living Dead"	King Diamond, Andy LaRocque	6:04

- "Christmas" contains an excerpt from "The Little Drummer Boy" written by Davis – Onorati – Simeone. Arranged by King Diamond

== Personnel ==
=== Band ===
- King Diamond – vocals, keyboards
- Andy LaRocque – guitars, keyboards
- Mike Wead – guitars
- Hal Patino – bass
- Matt Thompson – drums

=== Additional musician ===
- Livia Zita – additional vocals
