= Conspiracy (King Diamond album) =

Studio album by King Diamond
- Released: 21 August 1989
- Recorded: 1989
- Studio: Rumbo Recorders (Los Angeles)
- Genre: Heavy metal
- Length: 46:58
- Label: Roadrunner
- Producer: Roberto Falcao, King Diamond, Andy LaRocque, Chris Tsangarides

King Diamond chronology
"Them" (1988)	Conspiracy (1989)	The Eye (1990)

Professional ratings
Review scores
Source	Rating
AllMusic	3/5 stars
Collector's Guide to Heavy Metal	7/10

Conspiracy is the fourth studio album by Danish heavy metal band King Diamond, and the second part of a story that began on the album Them. Conspiracy was released on 21 August 1989 through Roadrunner Records, and is the last album to feature drummer Mikkey Dee who left the group but recorded the album as a session member.

The song "Cremation" appears in the 2009 video game Brütal Legend.

== Plot ==
After the events of "Them", an adult King returns to the House of Amon to reclaim his rightful place as heir to the house ("At the Graves"). He makes a deal with "Them", the unseen demonic antagonists from the previous album, to return control of the house to "Them" in exchange for the chance to see his now-dead sister Missy again, as he believes she can help answer some of his questions ("Sleepless Nights"). He attends sessions with a therapist named Dr. Landau, who he despises, distrusts and lies to; Landau suggests letting King's mother visit the House of Amon, and King reluctantly agrees ("Lies"). That night, Missy appears to him in a vision ("A Visit from the Dead") and warns him through a dream where he sees Landau marrying his mother ("The Wedding Dream"). The next day, King's mother indeed arrives accompanied by Dr. Landau; despite King's protestations about the deal with "Them", they enter the house, and King is ambushed and sedated by his mother and the doctor ("Amon Belongs to 'Them'"). They then go to the local demented priest Sammael, and convince him that King is possessed by Satan and must be disposed of ("Victimized"); they put King in a coffin and burn him ("Let It Be Done"), and the album closes with King's promise to haunt them forever from beyond the grave ("Cremation").

== Track listing ==
All tracks are written by King Diamond, except where indicated.

No.	Title	Writer(s)	Length
1.	"At the Graves"		8:56
2.	"Sleepless Nights"	Diamond, Andy LaRocque	5:05
3.	"Lies"		4:22
4.	"A Visit from the Dead"	Diamond, LaRocque	6:12
5.	"The Wedding Dream"		6:01
6.	"'Amon' Belongs to 'Them'"	Diamond, LaRocque	3:52
7.	"Something Weird" (instrumental)	LaRocque	2:07
8.	"Victimized"	Diamond, LaRocque	5:21
9.	"Let It Be Done"		1:13
10.	"Cremation" (instrumental)		4:12

"The Wedding Dream" contains the elements of "Bridal Chorus" by Richard Wagner in the introduction.

Remastered edition bonus tracks
No.	Title	Length
11.	"At the Graves (Alternate Mix)"	7:18
12.	"Cremation (Live Show Mix)"	4:12

== Personnel ==
- King Diamond – vocals
- Andy LaRocque – guitars
- Pete Blakk – guitars
- Hal Patino – bass

Additional personnel

- Mikkey Dee – drums
- Roberto Falcao – keyboards

Production

- King Diamond – production, mixing
- Andy LaRocque – production
- Roberto Falcao – production, engineering, mixing
- Chris Tsangarides – guitar solo production, mixing
- Gina Immel – assistant engineering
- Howie Weinberg – mastering at Masterdisk, New York
