= Them (King Diamond album) =

Studio album by King Diamond
- Released: 18 July 1988
- Recorded: 1988
- Studios: M.M.C. Studio, Copenhagen, Denmark
- Genre: Heavy metal
- Length: 41:39
- Label: Roadrunner
- Producers: King Diamond, Roberto Falcao

King Diamond chronology
Abigail (1987)	"Them" (1988)	Conspiracy (1989)

"Them" is the third studio album by Danish heavy metal band King Diamond, released on 18 July 1988 through Roadrunner Records in Europe, and 13 September 1988 through Roadracer Records in United States. It is the first album to feature guitarist Pete Blakk and bassist Hal Patino.

"Them" is the first of two fictional concept albums about King and his mentally ill grandmother, the second of these being Conspiracy. King falls into a harrowing descent into madness via his grandmother and the voices in the House of Amon, known to the listener only as "Them".

== Background ==
Following the release of the band debut album Abigail guitarist Michael Denner left the band. Denner was replaced by guitarist Pete Blakk. Timi Hansen rehearsed with King Diamond during the songwriting process of Them, however he did not play on the album instead teaching the parts to his successor Hal Patino. Guitarist Andy LaRocque, and drummer Mikkey Dee rounded out the rest of the lineup alongside King Diamond.

Decibel noted that Them is Diamond’s most personal album as he had gone through multiple life changing events around the creation of the album such as the death of his father. The twinkling instrument heard during the album’s opening and closing tracks is Diamond’s old childhood music box.

Them was the last King Diamond album to be recorded in their native Denmark.

== Plot summary ==
As the album opens, a young King and his mother and sister are welcoming King's grandmother home from a mental asylum ("Out From the Asylum", "Welcome Home"). That night, King investigates strange voices and discovers his grandmother having a tea party seemingly alone, though with the teacups and kettles floating in the air. King is invited into the room, to sit in his grandmother's chair. King is sent back to bed, but only after staring into his grandmother's eyes, whereupon she instructed him to forget what he saw ("The Invisible Guests").

One day, Grandma awakens King and tells him that she will teach him about the house of “Amon”, over a cup of tea. “Amon” being the tea pot, “Their” item of power and importance that seemed to require a blood sacrifice. Through the blood they commutate or take control of those who drink it. Grandma cuts King's sleeping mother's hand and adds her blood to the teapot. After drinking the “tea” the voices haunting the house ("Them") begin to affect King with a drug-like effect ("Tea"). King's sister Missy tries to convince King that they should do something to help their mother, who is unconscious and weak due to "their" control and possible blood loss, but his judgment is clouded due to his altered state. He refuses to call for help and cuts the phone line ("Mother's Getting Weaker"). At tea, Missy interrupts and furiously expresses concern about her mother's state, Missy being deemed a problem is attacked by Grandma and in spiteful retaliation, Missy breaks "Amon" the teapot ("Bye, Bye Missy").

"They", in furious response to the breaking of "their" beloved teapot "Amon", chop Missy into bits with an axe and throw the remains into the fireplace in the kitchen. "Their" focus no longer on King, he snapped out of his "spell," and he stumbles outside and pieces together the events that transpired. After fainting and regaining consciousness, he decides to attack his grandmother ("A Broken Spell"). He notices that "their" power is weakened outside the house, so he lures his grandmother outside and kills her ("The Accusation Chair"). The voices of Amon continue to haunt the boy ("Them") as he is questioned by police and incarcerated in an asylum ("Twilight Symphony"). Years later, he is released and returns home to find his grandmother and the voices of Amon are still very much alive ("Coming Home").

== Critical reception ==
Professional ratings
Review scores
Source	Rating
AllMusic	4/5 stars
Collector's Guide to Heavy Metal	7/10
Metal.de	9/10
Ultimate Guitar	10/10

Metal.de wrote "Them within the context of the 1980s metal scene as well as within his own discography the album is virtually unrivaled." Ultimate Guitar added "This is probably one of the most accomplished metal albums you will ever hear with amazingly tight guitar solos and incredible ability on the part of every member of the band." It is King Diamond’s highest charting album on the Billboard 200 peaking at number 89.

Travis Barker considers the album as an influence.

Them was inducted into the Decibel Hall of Fame in 2021, making it the second King Diamond album to be inducted.

== In other media ==
The song "Welcome Home" and lyrics from the song "The Invisible Guests" were featured in the film Clerks II. "Welcome Home" was also featured in the 2009 video game Brütal Legend.

== Track listing ==
All tracks are written by King Diamond, except where indicated.

No.	Title	Music	Length
1.	"Out from the Asylum"		1:44
2.	"Welcome Home"		4:36
3.	"The Invisible Guests"		5:04
4.	"Tea"		5:15
5.	"Mother's Getting Weaker"	Andy LaRocque	4:02
6.	"Bye, Bye Missy"		5:08
7.	"A Broken Spell"	Diamond, LaRocque	4:08
8.	"The Accusation Chair"		4:21
9.	"'Them'" (instrumental; Diamond, LaRocque)		1:56
10.	"Twilight Symphony"		4:10
11.	"Coming Home"		1:11

Remastered edition bonus tracks
No.	Title	Length
12.	"Phone Call"	1:39
13.	"The Invisible Guests" (rehearsal)	5:19
14.	"Bye, Bye Missy" (rehearsal)	4:51

== Personnel ==
- King Diamond – vocals, keyboards, guitar on rehearsal versions, producer, mixing
- Andy LaRocque – guitar, acoustic guitar on "Them", assistant producer
- Pete Blakk – guitar
- Hal Patino – bass guitar
- Mikkey Dee – drums, assistant producer
- Roberto Falcao – keyboards, producer, engineer, mixing
- Timi Hansen – bass only on rehearsal versions

== Charts ==
Chart (1988)	Peak position
Dutch Albums (Album Top 100)	68
Swedish Albums (Sverigetopplistan)	28
Billboard 200	89
