= King Diamond (band) =

Danish heavy metal band

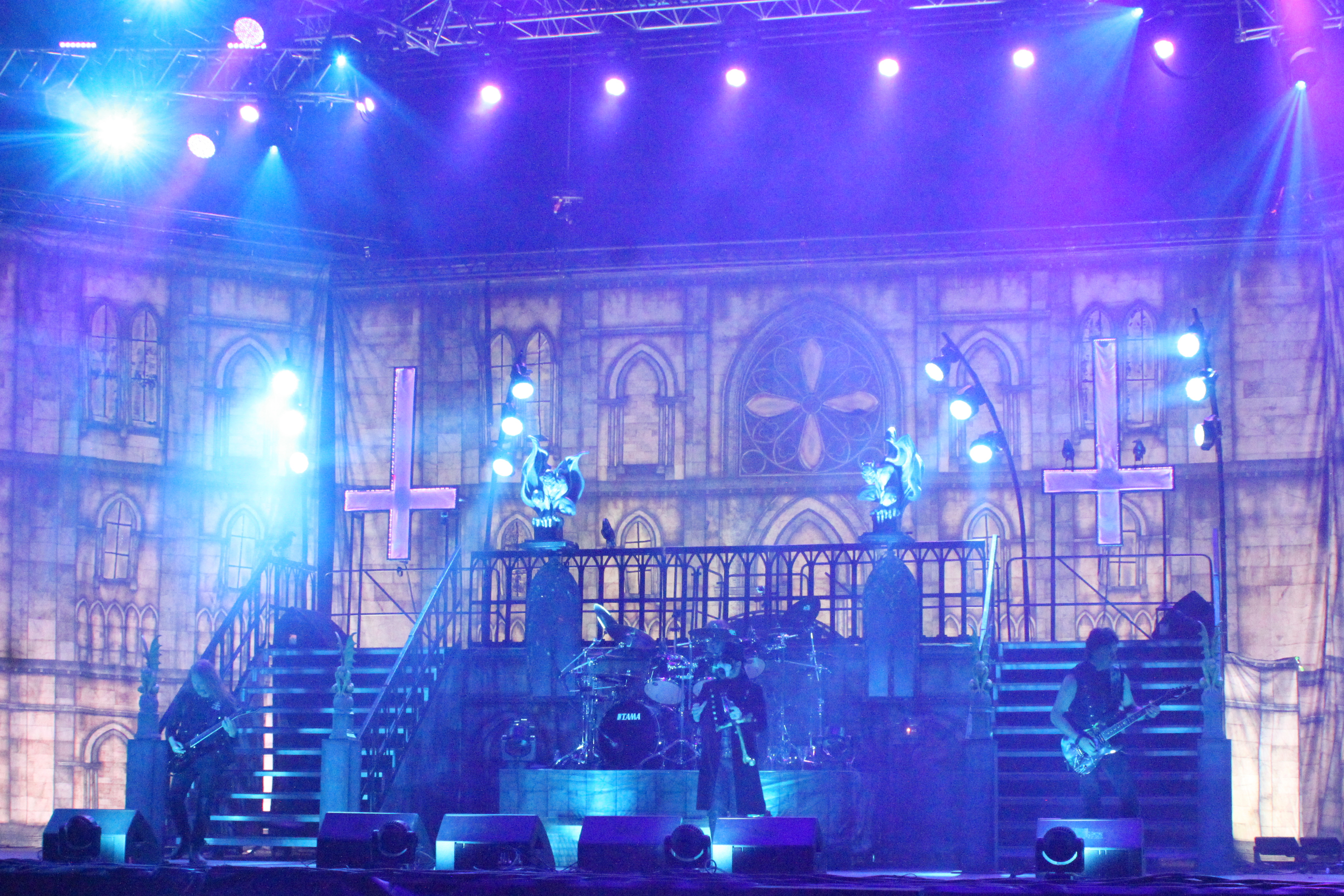
- King Diamond performing at Hellfest in 2016

Background information
- Origin: Copenhagen, Denmark
- Genre: Heavy metal
- Works: Discography
- Years active: 1985–1992; 1994–present
- Labels: Roadrunner; Metal Blade
- Spinoffs: Lex Legion
- Spinoff of: Mercyful Fate
- Members: King Diamond; Mike Wead; Matt Thompson; Pontus Egberg; Gus G
- Past members: See List of former King Diamond members
- Website: kingdiamondcoven.com

King Diamond is a Danish heavy metal band formed in 1985 by vocalist King Diamond, guitarists Andy LaRocque and Michael Denner, bassist Timi Hansen, and drummer Mikkey Dee. King, Denner and Hansen had recently disbanded Mercyful Fate, and formed a new band under the King Diamond moniker, already known from the initial Mercyful Fate era. Since the band's inception, there have been over fifteen musicians in and out of King Diamond, with Diamond as the only remaining original member, while LaRocque remained until 2026. Their current line-up consists of Diamond, guitarist Mike Wead, drummer Matt Thompson, bassist Pontus Egberg and guitarist Gus G as LaRocque's replacement.

King Diamond has released twelve studio albums (most of them are concept albums), two live albums, two extended plays, five compilation albums, and five singles. Their first album, Fatal Portrait, was released in 1986, followed a year later by the band's first concept album, Abigail (1987). Three more albums followed – "Them" (1988), Conspiracy (1989), and The Eye (1990) – before the band went on hiatus around 1992, when King Diamond, Denner, and Hansen reformed Mercyful Fate. He reformed the King Diamond band in 1994, and balanced recording and touring with Mercyful Fate and his eponymous band for nearly a decade, until the former went on hiatus again by the early 2000s. King Diamond's studio output has been minimal since 2007's Give Me Your Soul...Please, though the band has continued to perform live and occasionally teased more than one upcoming album.

== History ==
=== Formation, Fatal Portrait and Abigail (1985–1987) ===
Vocalist King Diamond, guitarist Michael Denner, and bassist Timi Hansen formed the band in 1985. The three had recently departed Mercyful Fate due to musical differences between Diamond and guitarist Hank Shermann. According to Diamond, when he, Denner, and Hansen formed a new band, they chose the name "King Diamond" to "get better deals", and because the name was already known from Mercyful Fate. To round out the line-up, the group hired Swedish musicians Mikkey Dee on drums and guitarist Floyd Konstantin, the latter of whom was dismissed two weeks before recording the debut album, and replaced by Swedish musician Andy LaRocque.

In July 1985, the band began recording their debut album at Sound Track Studio in Copenhagen. On 25 December, they released debut single "No Presents for Christmas". Fatal Portrait, the band's first full-length studio album, was released on 14 March 1986, through Roadrunner Records. Produced by Rune Höyer and Diamond, the album charted at number 33 on the Swedish album chart, and spawned the single "Halloween", released on 6 June 1986.

In December 1986, King Diamond began recording their second studio album at Sound Track Studio in Copenhagen. Abigail was released on 29 May 1987, and is the first concept album based on an original story by Diamond. The album was supported by its sole single, "The Family Ghost", for which they shot their first music video, and it went on to chart at number 39 in Sweden, number 68 in the Netherlands, and at number 123 on the Billboard 200. Following Abigail's release, Denner left the band due to touring strains. He was replaced by Mike Moon for the album's supporting tour, during which the band recorded the live album In Concert 1987: Abigail, which was not officially released until 1991.

=== "Them" and Conspiracy (1988–1989) ===
Following the Abigail tour, Moon and Timi Hansen were replaced by Pete Blakk and Hal Patino, respectively. On 18 July 1988, King Diamond released "Them", recorded at M.M.C. Studio in Copenhagen, Denmark. Another concept album, "Them" charted at number 38 on the Swedish album chart, number 65 on the Dutch album chart, and at number 89 on the Billboard 200, making it King Diamond's highest charting album in the U.S. to date. Another music video was shot, for the single "Welcome Home". On 1 November, the group released The Dark Sides EP, a collection of previously released material and one unreleased track.

Following the tour for "Them", Dee left King Diamond. He was rehired to play drums on the band's follow-up album, after which he was replaced by Snowy Shaw. On 21 August 1989, King Diamond released Conspiracy, which charted at number 41 on the Swedish album chart, number 64 on the Dutch album chart, and at number 111 on the Billboard 200. A continuation of the storyline from "Them", Conspiracy was the first King Diamond album recorded in the United States. It was tracked at Rumbo Recording Studios in Canoga Park, California. A music video was made for the track "Sleepless Nights".

=== The Eye to House of God (1990–2000) ===
In June 1990, King Diamond began recording The Eye at Sweet Silence Studios in Copenhagen, Denmark. It was released on 30 October 1990. Shaw performed the drums on the album using drum pads. It debuted at number 179 on the Billboard 200. The band did not tour in support of the album due to lack of label support. Following The Eye, Hal Patino and Pete Blakk were replaced by Sharlee D'Angelo and Mike Wead, respectively. This line-up did not record any material, as Diamond reunited with Mercyful Fate in 1992. He would balance recording and touring with Mercyful Fate and his eponymous band for the remainder of the 1990s.

After recording and touring with Mercyful Fate, King Diamond reformed in 1994. With King Diamond, Andy La Rocque, as well as guitarist Herb Simonsen, bassist Chris Estes and drummer Darrin Anthony from the Texas band Mindstorm, the band spent September through October 1994, recording their next album. Released on 6 June 1995, The Spider's Lullabye was the band's first album on Metal Blade Records, and their first studio release since Fatal Portrait to not be a concept album. The album peaked at number 31 on the Finnish album charts. In March 1996, King Diamond began recording their seventh studio album at the Dallas Sound Lab. King Diamond return to writing concept albums with The Graveyard, released on 1 October 1996. The album charted at number 23 in Finland. After the album's release, drummer Darrin Anthony left the band due to a car accident and was replaced by former Chastain drummer John Luke Hebert.

On 24 February 1998, King Diamond released Voodoo, which charted at number 27 on the Finnish album chart and at number 55 on the Swedish album chart. After the album's release, guitarist Herb Simonsen was replaced by Glen Drover. When Mercyful Fate was put on hold in 1999, King Diamond began recording House of God at the Nomad Recording Studio in Carrollton, Texas, with new bassist Paul David Harbour, who had replaced Chris Estes. Released on 20 June 2000, the album peaked at number 60 in Sweden. After the album's release, Drover, drummer Hebert and Harbour were replaced by Mike Wead, Matt Thompson and Hal Patino, respectively.

=== Later years (2001–2017) ===
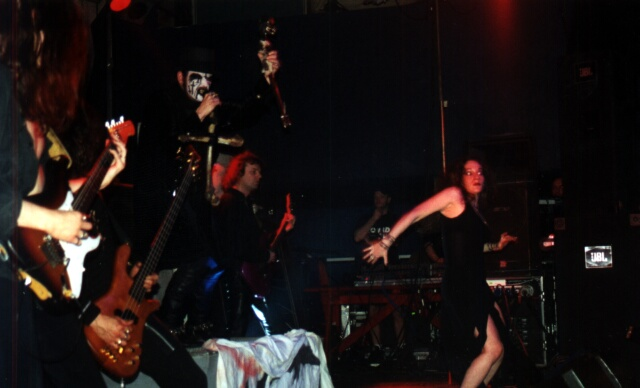
King Diamond performing in Kraków, 2001

In May 2001, King Diamond began recording its tenth studio album at the Nomad Recording Studio. Released on 29 January 2002, Abigail II: The Revenge was a sequel to 1987's Abigail. It was the first King Diamond album since 1990's The Eye to feature Patino, who rejoined the band during the recording process. King Diamond did not tour in support of Abigail II, as Metal Blade could not provide tour support, due to illegal downloading. Despite this, the album peaked at number 24 in Finland and at number 42 in Sweden.

On 21 October 2003, King Diamond released The Puppet Master, which charted at number 36 in Sweden. Besides the band, the album featured additional vocals from Diamond's wife Livia Zita. During the supporting tour for The Puppet Master, the band recorded the live album Deadly Lullabyes, released 21 September 2004. In April 2006, Dee (currently with Scorpions, formerly with Motörhead) guestappeared at King Diamond's sold-out show in Gothenburg, Sweden. On 26 June 2007, King Diamond released Give Me Your Soul...Please. The album peaked at number 25 on the Finnish chart, number 28 on the Swedish chart, and at number 174 on the Billboard 200. The track "Never Ending Hill" was nominated for a Grammy for "Best Metal Performance" (the group's first). A music video was made for the title track.

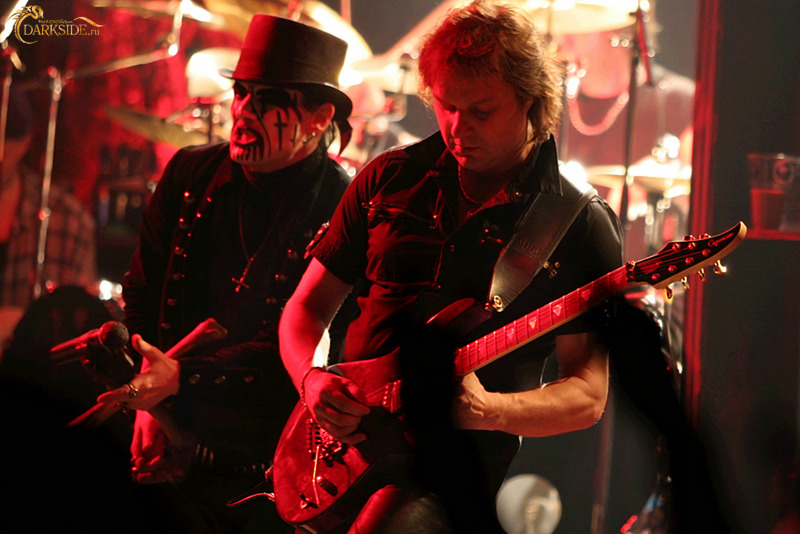
King Diamond (left) and Andy LaRocque (right) performing in Moscow, 2006

In late November 2010, Diamond was hospitalized after having several heart attacks. It was discovered that three of his arteries were blocked. He underwent triple bypass surgery. Following a successful operation, he returned home to rest. Diamond stopped smoking, changed his diet, and began exercising regularly, according to his wife. On 27 January 2012, Diamond made a special appearance at the "5th Annual Nomad Recording Studio Throwdown", performing three songs: "The Family Ghost", "Evil" and "Burn". On 9 June 2012, the King Diamond band played at the Sweden Rock Festival. They were joined on stage by Michael Denner, Hank Shermann, Mikkey Dee and Volbeat's Michael Poulsen. Diamond stated that the band was expected to begin writing their thirteenth studio album in the fall of 2012.

On 19 July 2014, the band announced that Patino had been dismissed for reasons similar to his firing from King Diamond in 1990. He was replaced by Pontus Egberg, formerly of Lion's Share and the Poodles. In October, King Diamond announced the compilation Dreams of Horror, released in November through Metal Blade Records, covering the band's career. In December, Egberg became an official member of the band.

King Diamond took part in the 2015 Rockstar Energy Mayhem Festival along with headliner Slayer, Hellyeah, The Devil Wears Prada, Thy Art Is Murder, Jungle Rot, Sister Sin, Sworn In, Shattered Sun, Feed Her to the Sharks, Code Orange and Kissing Candice. The tour ran from 26 June through 2 August. At the 8 July 2015 show in Milwaukee, Wisconsin, Diamond perform without face paint due to an eye infection; doctors advised against makeup. He said that there was no negative feedback from the fans. The band embarked on a U.S. tour from October to December 2015 with Exodus, where they performed Abigail in its entirety.

=== Saint Lucifer's Hospital 1920 and planned future albums (2018–present) ===
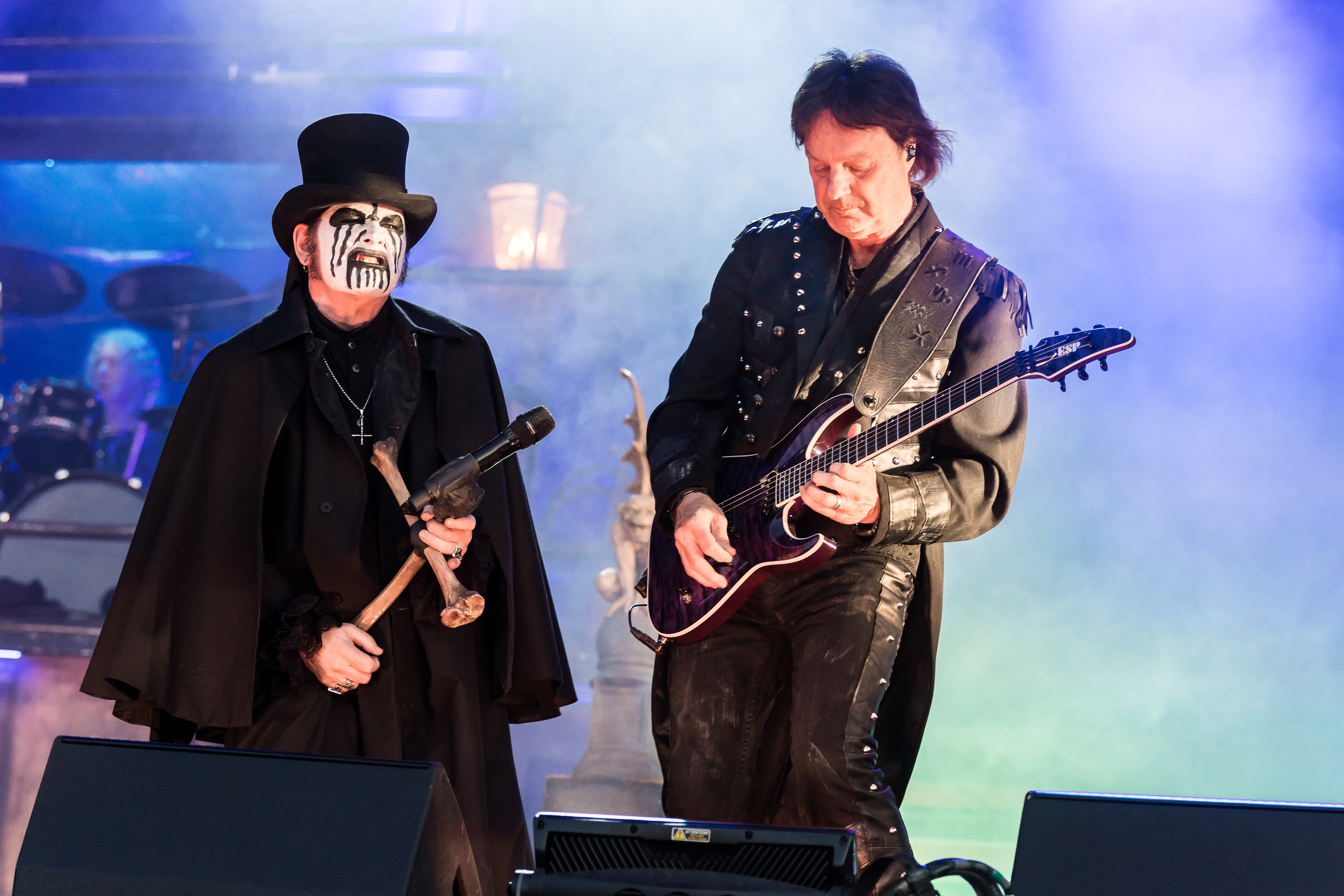
King Diamond performing in Ballenstedt, Germany, 2025

By 2018, King Diamond had begun work on its thirteenth studio album, divided into two parts to connect with its theme. The first part of the series was revealed to be titled The Institute; the title was changed to Saint Lucifer's Hospital 1920. The album has been delayed many times since its initial planned release date of 2020, due to frontman King Diamond taking his time on perfecting new material by the King Diamond band and the reunited Mercyful Fate. The first single from the album, "Masquerade of Madness", was available for streaming on 8 November 2019. On 25 January 2019, the band's first live DVD/Blu-ray, Songs for the Dead Live, was released. The band embarked on a North American tour with Uncle Acid and the Deadbeats and Idle Hands.

On 15 October 2024, during a performance at the Port Authority of San Antonio, King Diamond debuted the songs "Spider Lilly" and "Electro Therapy". On this tour, which was supported by Overkill and Night Demon, the band was joined by Myrkur on keyboards, and she appears on the studio recording of "Spider Lilly", released as a single on 17 December. It was also the debut single from the band's forthcoming "Horror Trilogy", with the first part titled Saint Lucifer's Hospital 1920. During the summer of 2025, King Diamond went on a European tour; some dates were cancelled due to Diamond having strep throat.

In November 2025, Diamond was honored by the Danish Arts Foundation and given the lifetime honour for his "very special efforts and contributions to Danish art and cultural life." In addition, Diamond will receive a yearly 189,000 Danish Kroner (about $26,000) grant from the foundation for the rest of his life.

In March 2026, guitarist Andy LaRocque stated that the band was hoping to release their 13th studio album Saint Lucifer's Hospital 1920 sometime later in the year. When asked that June when it would be released, LaRocque admitted, "Nobody knows. We'll see. But all I can say is that we're working on it."

On 24 July 2026, it was announced that the band had parted ways with original guitarist Andy LaRocque, and replaced him with Firewind and former Ozzy Osbourne guitarist Gus G. King Diamond confirmed that September that the band's new album will be released in 2028.

== Artistry ==
Although King Diamond is primarily a heavy metal or extreme metal band, their works have seen the band combine elements of thrash metal, speed metal, black metal, power metal, progressive metal, and groove metal, with "spectacular spooky heavy metal" and "theatrical storytelling".

Lyrically, King Diamond is known for creating conceptual works that feature recurring stories that include the supernatural, horror, fate and death. His lyrics have been described as a "gothic horror romance in metal form, delivered with technical precision and theatrical grandeur." In an interview with Blabbermouth.net, Diamond stated that a lot of his lyrics are drawn from real-life, but some comes from his imagination "to make a story flow, you change some of the things that you've experienced. When an album is done and I read through all the lyrics, I get a little uneasy when I see how much of myself I've put into the stories. But then again, I know that no one's going to know unless I tell them exactly what's what, and I'm certainly not going to do that. But it's drawn from everywhere."

The band is known for their massive production during live performances featuring fog in order to create creepy on stage theatrics. Their lead singer King Diamond is also known to use a microphone stand consisting of a femur bone and a tibia bone in the shape of a cross, while also dawning his signature Corpse paint. CBS News described him as a "menacing figure live".

== Members ==
Current members

- King Diamond – vocals, keyboards (1985–present)
- Mike Wead – guitars (2000–present)
- Matt Thompson – drums (2000–present)
- Pontus Egberg – bass (2014–present)
- Gus G – guitars (2026–present)

== Discography ==
- Fatal Portrait (1986)
- Abigail (1987)
- "Them" (1988)
- Conspiracy (1989)
- The Eye (1990)
- The Spider's Lullabye (1995)
- The Graveyard (1996)
- Voodoo (1998)
- House of God (2000)
- Abigail II: The Revenge (2002)
- The Puppet Master (2003)
- Give Me Your Soul...Please (2007)
- Saint Lucifer's Hospital 1920 (2028)

== Awards and nominations ==
Grammy Awards

Year	Nominee / work	Award	Result
2008	"Never Ending Hill"	Best Metal Performance	Nominated

Loudwire Music Awards

Year	Nominee / work	Award	Result
2015	King Diamond	Best Live Act	Nominated

Decibel Hall of Fame

Year	Nominee / work	Award	Result
2015	Abigail	Decibel Hall of Fame	Inducted
2021	"Them"	Decibel Hall of Fame	Inducted

Danish Arts Foundation

Year	Nominee / work	Award	Result
2025	King Diamond (the vocalist)	Lifetime Award	Won

Metal Hammer Germany

Year	Nominee / work	Award	Result
2017	King Diamond (the vocalist)	Legend Award	Nominated
