= Mikkey Dee =

Swedish drummer

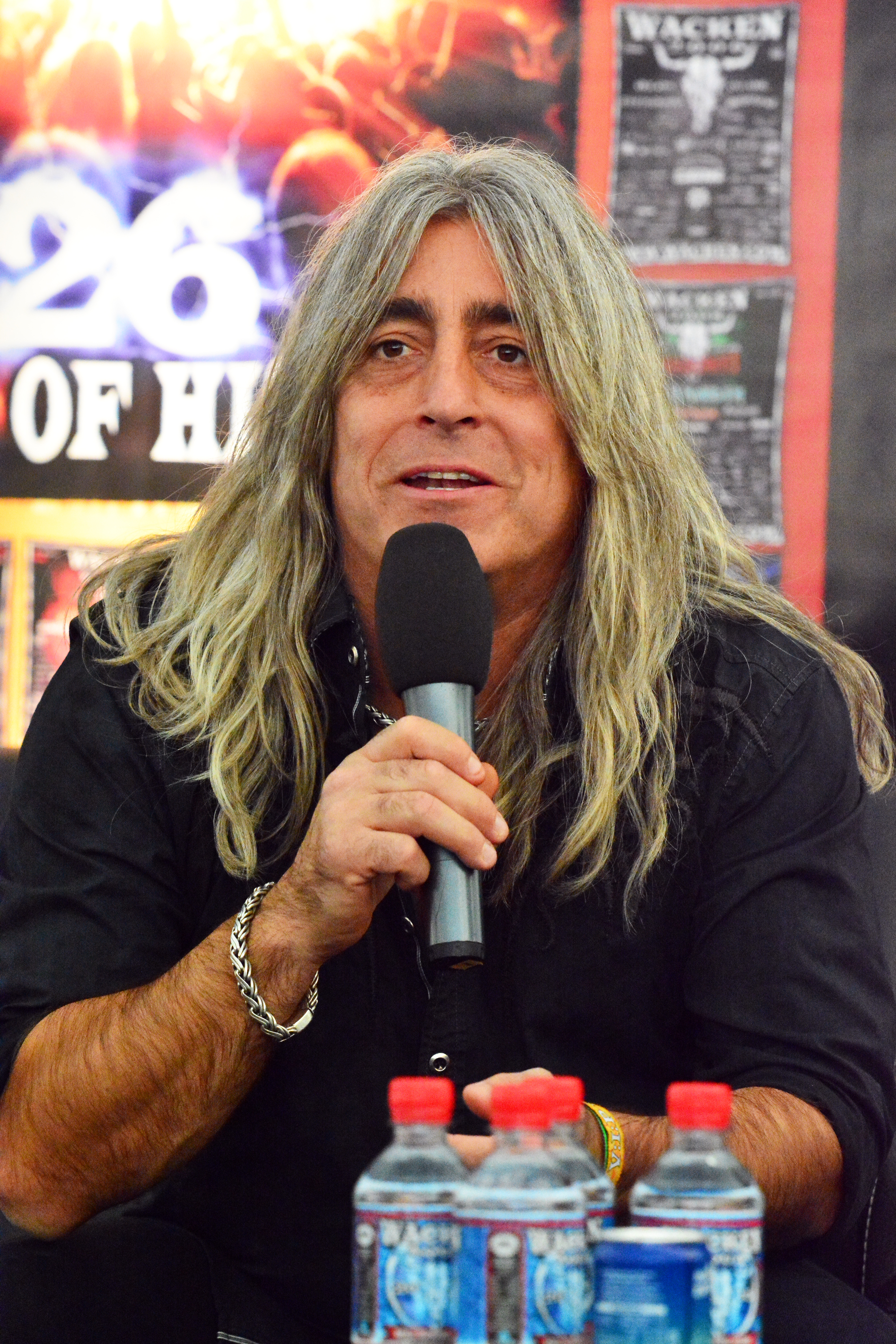
- Dee in 2015

Background information
- Born: Micael Kiriakos Delaoglou; 31 October 1963 (age 62); Gothenburg, Sweden
- Genres: Heavy metal; hard rock
- Occupation: Drummer
- Years active: 1977–present
- Member of: Scorpions; Lex Legion
- Formerly of: Motörhead; King Diamond; Don Dokken; Thin Lizzy
- Website: mikkeydee.com

Micael Kiriakos Delaoglou (born 31 October 1963), known professionally as Mikkey Dee, is a Swedish musician, who has played drums for German heavy metal band Scorpions since 2016 and with Lex Legion since 2026. He was the drummer for English heavy metal band Motörhead from 1992 until 2015, and has played with other artists including King Diamond, Helloween and Don Dokken. Dee is known for his lengthy drum solos, which can last between five and fifteen minutes.

== Early life and influences ==
Dee was born in Gothenburg, Sweden to a Greek father and a Swedish mother. He began his musical career with local bands Nadir and Geisha. His main influences include Neil Peart, Brian Downey, Buddy Rich, Steve Smith and especially Ian Paice.

== Career ==
=== King Diamond (1985–1989) ===
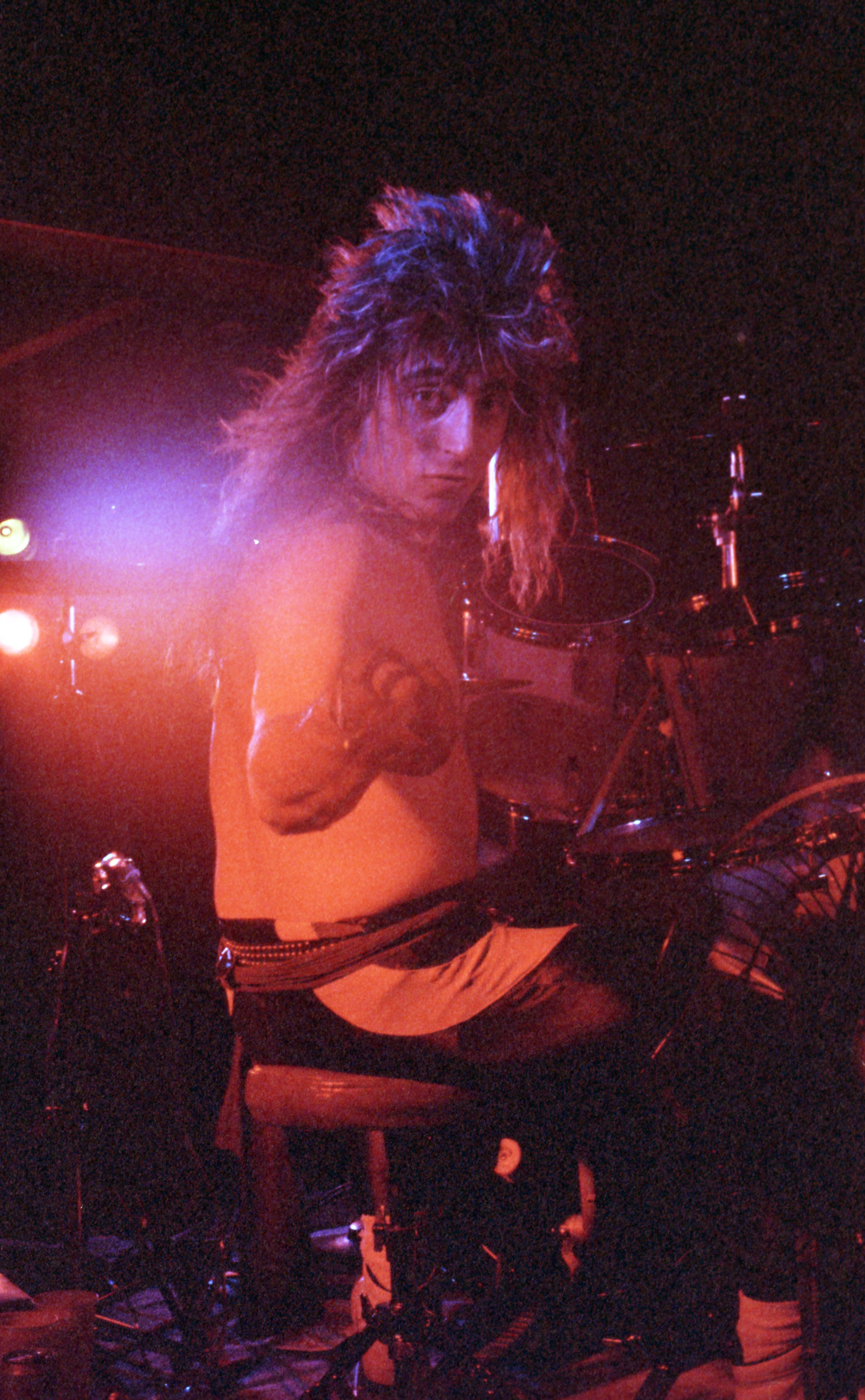
Dee with King Diamond in 1987

Having moved to Copenhagen, Denmark to play with Geisha, Dee joined King Diamond in 1985. He played on the King Diamond recordings Fatal Portrait (1986), Abigail (1987) and Them (1988). King Diamond himself was becoming quite popular and the musicians backing him were taking a secondary role in the writing and decision making. After the completion of the supporting tour for Them, he decided to leave the band as he felt that he was becoming more of a backup musician rather than an equal contributing songwriter. However, he was rehired to play session drums for the recording of the band's follow-up album, Conspiracy (1989). After completion of the album, he was replaced by Snowy Shaw.

=== Don Dokken (1990) ===
Dee joined Don Dokken for his solo album Up from the Ashes (1990). The music videos for the songs "Stay" and "Mirror Mirror" received airplay on MTV's Headbangers Ball. The band headlined their own tour as well as opening for Judas Priest. During this time, he filled in temporarily for the band World War Three (WWIII).

=== Motörhead and other work (1992–2015) ===
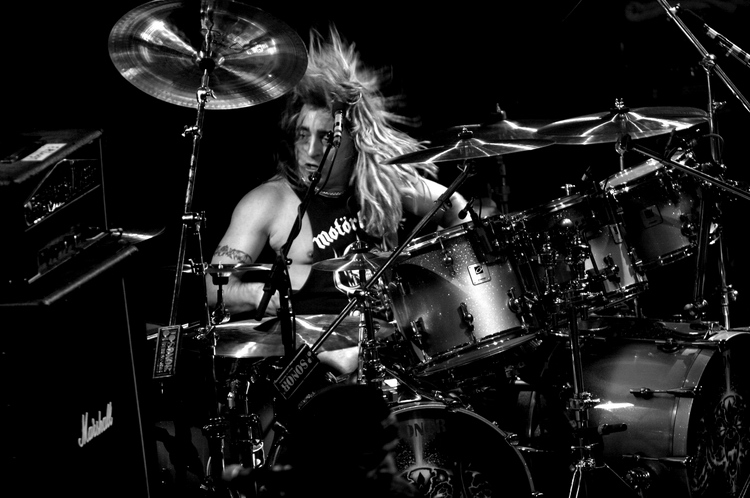
Dee performing a drum solo

While King Diamond was touring with Motörhead, frontman Lemmy repeatedly asked Dee to join his band. In 1992, Dee accepted, replacing Phil "Philthy Animal" Taylor.

On his replacement of a longstanding member, Dee said in 2006:

"Phil Taylor was great when he was good... so I could never have filled that space. It's like when you get married and have kids; no one can take my father's place… I could never be Phil Taylor, so I had to introduce Mikkey Dee into Motörhead."

Dee's first gig with the band was on 30 August 1992 at Saratoga Performing Arts Center in New York. He did not have much input on that year's March ör Die album which had been recorded with Tommy Aldridge prior to Dee joining. Dee played on the band's albums Hellraiser and Hell on Earth – the soundtrack for Hellraiser III: Hell on Earth. Although Aldridge recorded most of the drum tracks, Dee's photo appeared on the rear album sleeve. Aldridge said that Dee could take credit for the playing but Dee declined, citing differing styles.

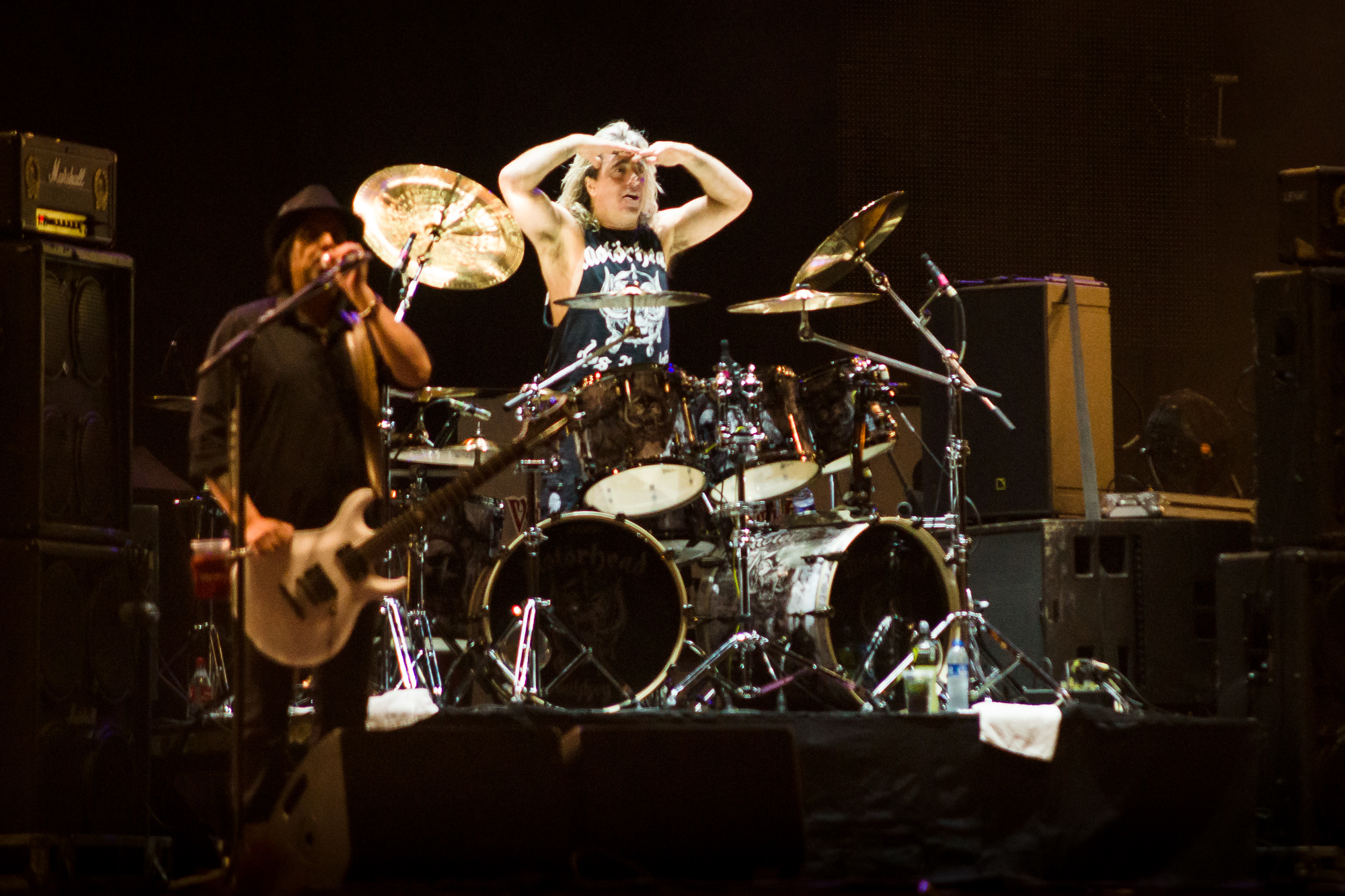
Dee performing with Motörhead at Ursynalia Festival 2013, Warsaw, Poland

Epic Records dropped the band after the soundtrack's release and the group continued recording with German label SPV. They also started a label called "Motörhead" which was distributed through Warner-Chappell and ZYX. Dee's first album for this label was 1993's Bastards. Dee also played drums on Helloween's 2003 album Rabbit Don't Come Easy, stepping in for Mark Cross.

In April 2006, King Diamond reunited with Dee at a sold-out gig at Kåren in Gothenburg, Sweden. King referred to Dee as "one of the best [drummers] of all time and that's something that has bothered us since he left."

Dee played drums for Martin "E-Type" Eriksson in the Swedish pre-qualification for the Eurovision Song Contest 2004 as well as on E-Type's 2003 EuroMetal Tour.

Dee was a contestant on series 1 of Kändisdjungeln on TV4 in 2009 but was eliminated in the 15th episode. While filming, his place was filled on tour by Matt Sorum, who commented: "I thought either Mikkey would die in the jungle or I would die on the Motörhead tour."

Following Lemmy's death in December 2015, Dee announced that Motörhead had disbanded.

=== Scorpions (2016–present) ===
Dee joined Thin Lizzy to play on their anniversary shows in January 2016. However, on 19 April, it was announced that he would not be participating. Subsequently, it was announced that Dee would be filling in for James Kottak on the Scorpions' twelve North American headlining dates, including a run of shows at the Hard Rock Hotel in Las Vegas dubbed "Scorpions blacked out in Las Vegas". Dee later joined the band permanently.

On November 5, 2024, Dee took to social media to refute unsubstantiated reports of his death.

== Musical style ==
Dee is known for lengthy drum solos, often lasting between five and fifteen minutes. Some notable examples include those that appear in Sacrifice, In the Name of Tragedy, and The One to Sing the Blues.

== Equipment ==
Dee uses Sonor drums, Paiste cymbals, Evans drumheads, and Wincent Drums sticks. He also used Remo heads in the past. His main kit is a Sonor SQ2 Vintage Maple Custom Finish set.

== Personal life ==
Dee is an avid ice hockey fan and a supporter of the Frölunda HC team from Gothenburg. The rumor that he was a member of a Swedish National Youth Hockey team, which began with an interview on Motörhead's Stage Fright DVD, has been rebutted by Dee himself. He stated: "At the end of the 80s and a bit into the 90s I played for a team called Team Sweden in southern California."

Mikkey Dee lives in Gothenburg with his longtime girlfriend Mia. They have two sons together.

In 2019, Dee opened a rock bar in Paris named Alabama.

In 2022, he used his ability to drive articulated trucks to advertise Volvo's Electric Trucks.

== Discography ==
=== King Diamond ===
- Fatal Portrait (1986)
- Abigail (1987)
- Them (1988)
- Conspiracy (1989)
- In Concert 1987: Abigail (1991)

=== Don Dokken ===
- Up from the Ashes (1990)

=== Motörhead ===
- March ör Die (1992) - "Hellraiser" only
- Bastards (1993)
- Sacrifice (1995)
- Overnight Sensation (1996)
- Snake Bite Love (1998)
- We Are Motörhead (2000)
- Hammered (2002)
- Inferno (2004)
- Kiss of Death (2006)
- Motörizer (2008)
- The Wörld Is Yours (2010)
- Aftershock (2013)
- Bad Magic (2015)

=== Helloween ===
- Rabbit Don't Come Easy (2003) - tracks 1–6, 8–10, 12

=== Scorpions ===
- Born to Touch Your Feelings: Best of Rock Ballads (2017; 3 tracks)
- Rock Believer (2022)

=== Lex Legion ===
- Lex Legion (2026)

=== Other ===
- Drums on "Mange Tak" by Danish band Shu-bi-dua on the album Shu-bi-dua 12 (1987)
- "Distant Voices" on "Face the Truth" (1992)
- "Welcome Home (Sanitarium)" on Metallic Assault: A Tribute to Metallica (2001)
- "Fear of the Dark" on Numbers from the Beast: An All Star Salute to Iron Maiden (2005)
- "Zombie Slam" on Psalms of Extinction (2007) by Pain
- United – Where is the Fire (This video was made to raise funds to help the victims of 2004 tsunami disaster; the DVD features an All Star band of Scandinavian musicians, consisting of Göran Edman as one of the main singers, Mikkey Dee on the drums, Tommy Denander, Kee Marcello, John Levén, Yngwie Malmsteen, Tommy Nilsson, Jim Jidhed, Geir Rönning, Mattias Eklund, Thomas Vikstrom, Peter Tägtgren, Stefan Andersson, Mats Levén and many others.)
- Nadir "Snön Faller Ner/Ett Nytt Försök" 7" (1982, Nadir NADS001) and "Frusna tårar/Sommar" 7" (1983, ProTape Records PTS 326) - both singles also feature Snowstorm (band) singer Gunnar Jaunupe, and PTS 326 also Yngwie Malmsteen, Glory and Silver Mountain keyboardist Mats Olausson
