= Andy LaRocque =

Swedish guitarist and record producer

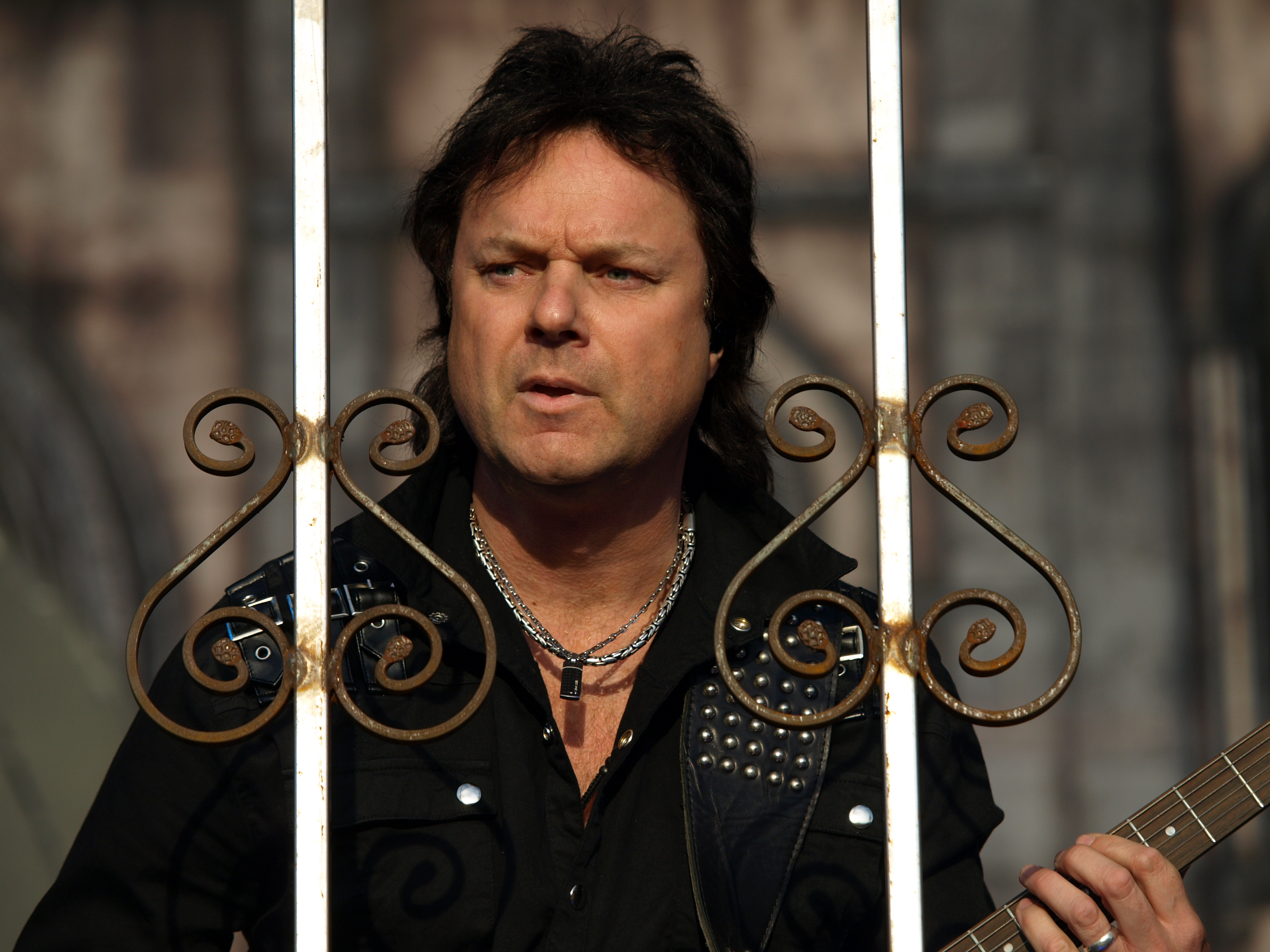
- LaRocque in 2013

Background information
- Born: Anders Allhage; 29 November 1962 (age 63); Gothenburg, Sweden
- Genres: Heavy metal, death metal, thrash metal, melodic death metal, black metal, neoclassical metal
- Occupations: Musician, record producer, songwriter
- Instruments: Guitar, keyboards
- Member of: Lex Legion
- Formerly of: King Diamond; IllWill

Andy LaRocque (born Anders Allhage, 29 November 1962) is a Swedish guitarist, songwriter and record producer, best known for being a member of the heavy metal band King Diamond from 1985 until his departure in 2026.

== Biography ==
LaRocque started out in the mid 1980s in the Gothenburg hard rock bands Trafalgar and an early version of Swedish Erotica.

He played on the Death album Individual Thought Patterns in 1993.

LaRocque contributed a guitar solo to the track "Cold" on the 1995 album Slaughter of the Soul by Swedish melodic death metal group At the Gates. Producer Fredrik Nordström was responsible for the idea, and telephoned LaRocque. At the Gates' guitarist Anders Björler gave LaRocque an audio cassette recording of the song. The tape played at the wrong speed at LaRocque's house, so LaRocque had to transcribe the recording. Two days after receiving the cassette, LaRocque laid down a guitar solo for the song within half an hour. Björler described the solo as "great" and in a November 2007 interview admitted he still couldn't play the solo "properly".

He played on the 1995 IllWill album Evilution, along with former members of Mercyful Fate.

LaRocque opened a studio called the "Los Angered Recordings" in Angered, Sweden in 1995, where he produced and recorded albums for many bands. In 2007, he moved the studio to Varberg and renamed it "Sonic Train Studios" where he continues to record and produce for various rock and heavy metal bands.

He can be heard on the 2002 Falconer album Chapters from a Vale Forlorn, where he performed lead guitars on the song "Busted to the Floor".

He is known for his signature playing style which incorporates neoclassical elements, using exotic scales such as harmonic minor, phrygian dominant, and diminished minor. His extended theory knowledge enables him to mix these scales with others such as the blues scale and melodic minor. He has a distinct guitar tone for his solos, and often incorporates layers of harmonies over his runs and phrasing. He frequently uses a mixture of classically-flavored arpeggio sequences and alternate picked runs mixed with melodic lines to create his signature style.

LaRocque was nominated for a Grammy Award in 2007. He is regularly listed as among the best or most underrated guitarists in heavy metal. He cites Michael Schenker and Randy Rhoads as major influences. He also likes Steve Vai and Tony Iommi, and was impressed by the friendliness of Chuck Schuldiner when he recorded Individual Thought Patterns with him.

== Discography ==
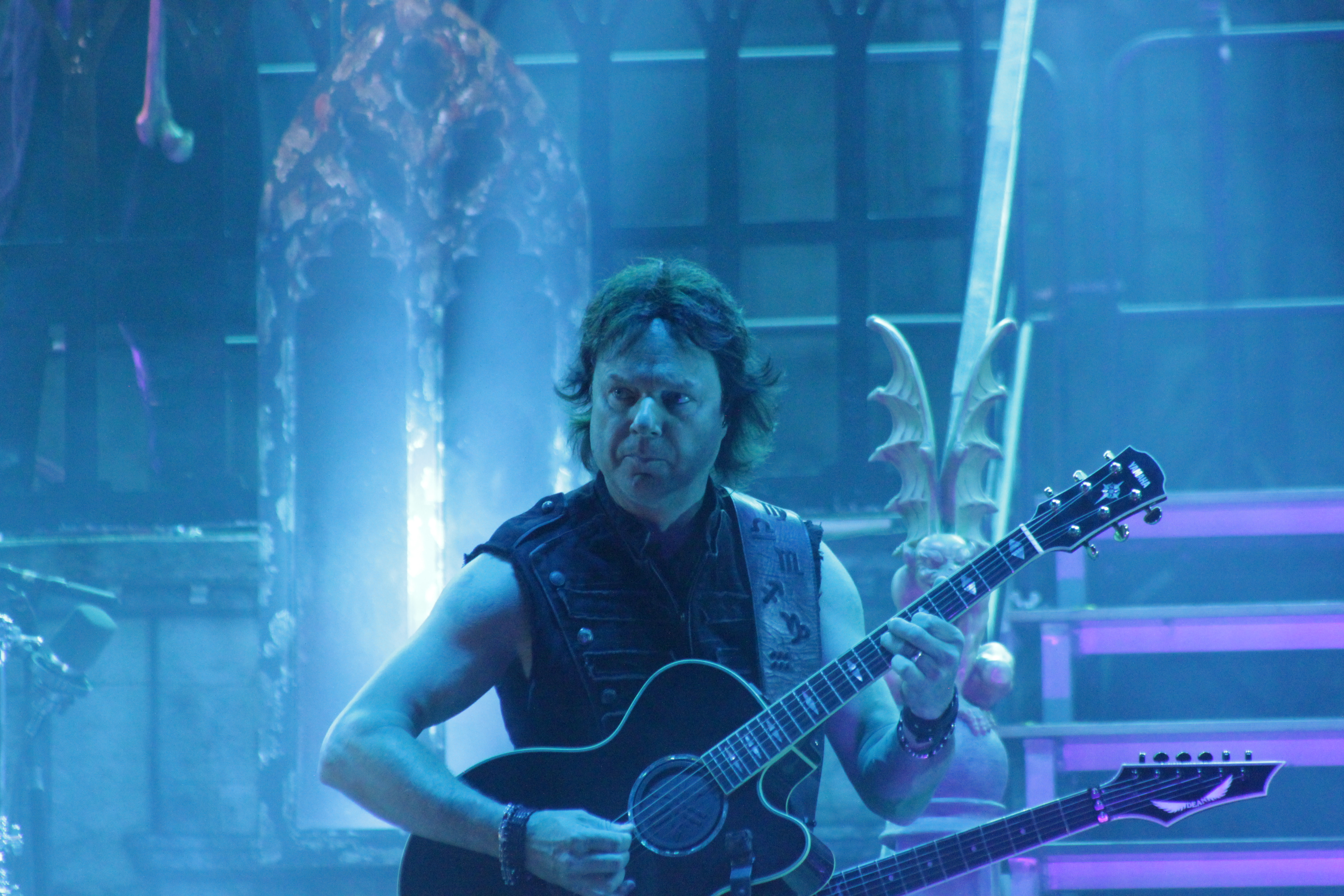
LaRoque with King Diamond at Hellfest 2016

=== With Lex Legion ===
- Lex Legion (2026)

=== With King Diamond ===
- Fatal Portrait (1986)
- Abigail (1987)
- Them (1988)
- Conspiracy (1989)
- The Eye (1990)
- In Concert 1987: Abigail (1991)
- The Spider's Lullabye (1995)
- The Graveyard (1996)
- Voodoo (1998)
- House of God (2000)
- Abigail II: The Revenge (2002)
- The Puppet Master (2003)
- Deadly Lullabyes: Live (2004)
- Give Me Your Soul...Please (2007)

=== With Death ===
- Individual Thought Patterns (1993)

=== With IllWill ===
- Evilution (1999)

=== As guest musician ===
- Patronian ft. Sororicide – Open Abyss (2025), guitar solo on "Open Abyss" "In Memory Of Frodi Finsson 1974-1994"
- At the Gates – Slaughter of the Soul (1995), guitar solo on "Cold"
- Dimmu Borgir – World Misanthropy (2002), guitar solo on "Devil's Path" (Re-recorded version)
- Roadrunner United – (2005), trade off guitar solo on "Constitution Down"
- Evergrey – The Dark Discovery (1998)
- Einherjer – Norwegian Native Art (2000), guitar solo on "Doomfaring"
- Falconer – Chapters from a Vale Forlorn (2002), lead guitar on "Busted to the Floor"
- Falconer – The Sceptre of Deception (2003), lead guitar on "Hear Me Pray"
- Falconer – Grime vs. Grandeur (2005), vocals on bonustrack "Wake Up"
- Yyrkoon – Unhealthy Opera (2006), guitar solo on "Horror from the Sea"
- Melechesh – Sphynx (2004), guitar solo on "Purifier of the Stars"
- Witchery – Witchkrieg (2010), guitar solo on "From Dead to Worse"
- Darzamat – Solfernus' Path (2010), guitar solo on "King of the Burning Anthems"
- Snowy Shaw – Snowy Shaw is Alive! (2011)
- Shining – Redefining Darkness (2012), second guitar solo on "For the God Below"
- Sandalinas – Living on the Edge (2005), fill guitar solo on "If it Wasn't for You" and second guitar solo on "All Along the Everglades
- Sandalinas – Fly to the Sun (2008), guitar solo on "The Healer Talks" and co-writer with Jordi Sandalinas of instrumental track "Back From the Light"
- Sandalinas – Power to the People, the Raw E.P (2013), co-writer of "Haunted Visions" jointly with Rick Altzi.
- Hell:on – The Hunt (2013), guitar solo on "Slaughter Smell"
- Ravenoir – The Darkest Flame Of Eternal Blasphemy (2020), guitar solo on "The Darkest Flame Of Eternal Blasphemy"
- Silver Talon - Decadence and Decay (2021), guitar solo on "Resistance 2029"
- Correa- Guitar solo on "Titans Unleashed" (2023)
- Shining – Fidelis Ad Mortem (2023)
- Disparaged – Down The Heavens (2024), guitar solo on „Another Day“
- Margantha – Blood Moon Sacrifice (2025), guitar solo on „Miriam and the endless night“

=== As producer ===
Andy LaRocque owns Sonic Train Studios in Varberg, Sweden. The notable bands which recorded in Sonic Train Studios include:

- Astroqueen – Into Submission (2001)
- Ancient – "Proxima Centauri" (2001)
- Einherjer – Odin Owns Ye All (1998)
- Sacramentum – Thy Black Destiny (1999)
- Sacramentum – The Coming of Chaos (1997)
- Evergrey – In Search of Truth (2001)
- Falconer – Falconer (2001)
- Falconer – The Sceptre of Deception (2003) – also guitar
- Runemagick – Darkness Death Doom (2003) – drum producer only
- Eidolon – Apostles of Defiance (2004) – also guitar
- Evergrey – The Dark Discovery (1998) – also guitar
- Evergrey – Solitude, Dominance, Tragedy (1999)
- Midvinter - At the Sight of the Apocalypse Dragon (1997) - produced and engineered
- Melechesh – Sphynx (2004) – also guitar
- Kreyson - "Návrat Krále" (2013)
- Dragonland – The Battle of the Ivory Plains (2005)
- Einherjer – Norwegian Native Art (2005) – also guitar
- Falconer – Grime vs. Grandeur (2005)
- Sandalinas – Living on the Edge (2005)
- Runemagick – Envenom (2005)
- Lord Belial
- Darzamat – Transkarpatia (2005)
- Siebenburgen – Revelation VI (2008)
- Shining – Redefining Darkness (2012)
- Various - Metal Blade Records 20th Anniversary (2002)
- Shining – Shining (2023) - also guitar on the "Fidelis Ad Mortem" single
