= King Diamond =

Danish rock musician (born 1956)

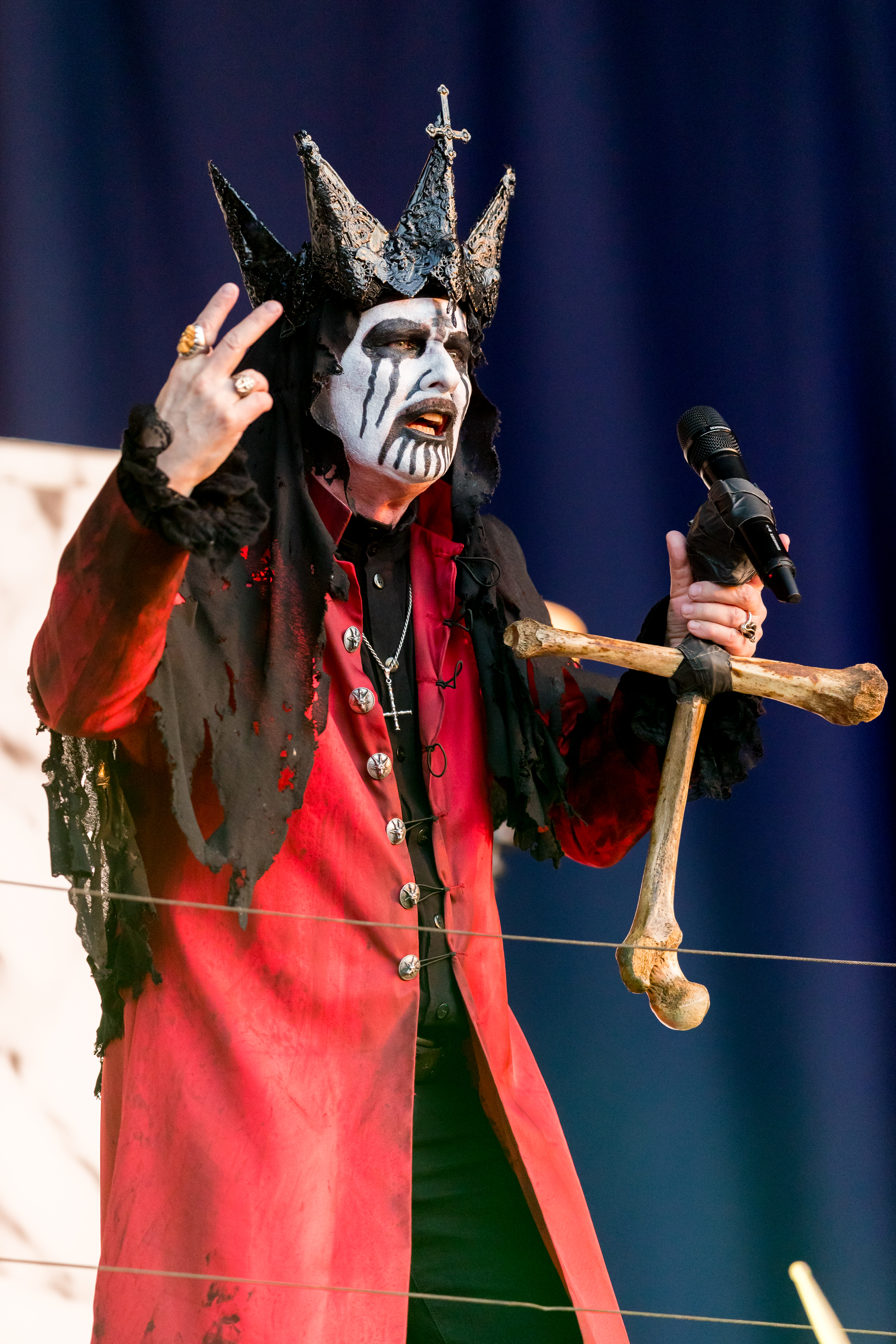
- King Diamond performing in 2022

Background information
- Born: Kim Bendix Petersen; 14 June 1956 (age 70); Hvidovre, Denmark
- Genres: Heavy metal; shock rock
- Occupations: Singer; songwriter; musician; producer
- Instruments: Vocals; keyboards; guitar
- Years active: 1974–present
- Member of: King Diamond; Mercyful Fate
- Website: kingdiamondcoven.com

Kim Bendix Petersen (born 14 June 1956), better known by his stage name King Diamond, is a Danish rock musician. As a vocalist, he is known for his powerful and wide-ranging countertenor singing voice, in particular his far-reaching falsetto screams. He is the lead vocalist and lyricist for both Mercyful Fate and the eponymous King Diamond. He also plays keyboards and guitars on studio recordings but uses live shows to focus solely on his vocal performance. Diamond is renowned for his dark lyrical content and his story concepts. He is also known for his distinctive shock stage persona (in particular his black and white facepaint). He has been an influence for other rock and metal artists, including Metallica, Slayer and Cradle of Filth..

== Career ==
=== Early days ===
Kim Petersen was born in Hvidovre, a suburb of Copenhagen, Denmark on June 14, 1956. His father worked as a foreman at a storage facility, while his mother was secretary to the city's mayor. He grew up alongside his younger brother Stig. He revealed that growing up there was strict discipline in the way he and his brother were raised but lived a "very normal childhood." Petersen first became curious about occultism after listening to Black Sabbath and reading about Jimmy Page's interest in Aleister Crowley. These interests eventually led to him reading the work of Anton LaVey.

He attended basic school for 10 years and then attended college, where studied to become a lab assistant. By this time he was playing music but mostly as a hobby.

King Diamond's first heavy rock band was called Brainstorm (1974–76), with Jeanette Blum (Jean Blue) on vocals and bass, Michael Frohn (Mike West) on guitar and Jes Jacobsen (Jesse James) on drums. Diamond left Brainstorm and began singing with local Danish hard rock band Black Rose. He began experimenting with horror-themed theatrics and shaping a malevolent quasi-Satanic stage persona. He left Black Rose and joined the punk-metal band Brats, where he met Hank Shermann. The two were soon asked to help Michael Denner (also formerly a member of Brats) with his own project, Danger Zone. This band included Timi Hansen, and the musicians would join with Diamond in 1980 to become Mercyful Fate.

=== Mercyful Fate ===
When Diamond first started Mercyful Fate, the band was not making much money and was taking up a lot of his time. Eventually, he decided to quit his job and live off of social security in order to focus on the band. Not long afterward, however, Mercyful Fate began to take off.

Following Mercyful Fate's 1984 release of Don't Break the Oath and the subsequent tour (which saw them play in the U.S. for the first time), Diamond split ways with Mercyful Fate. With him, he took two of his bandmates (Hansen and Denner) to pursue a solo career under his own name.

Mercyful Fate reunited in 1992 (while Diamond simultaneously continued his solo career) and recorded five more studio albums. In 1999, Diamond and Hank Shermann performed the song "Evil" live with Metallica. This performance also featured Diamond without his famous makeup.

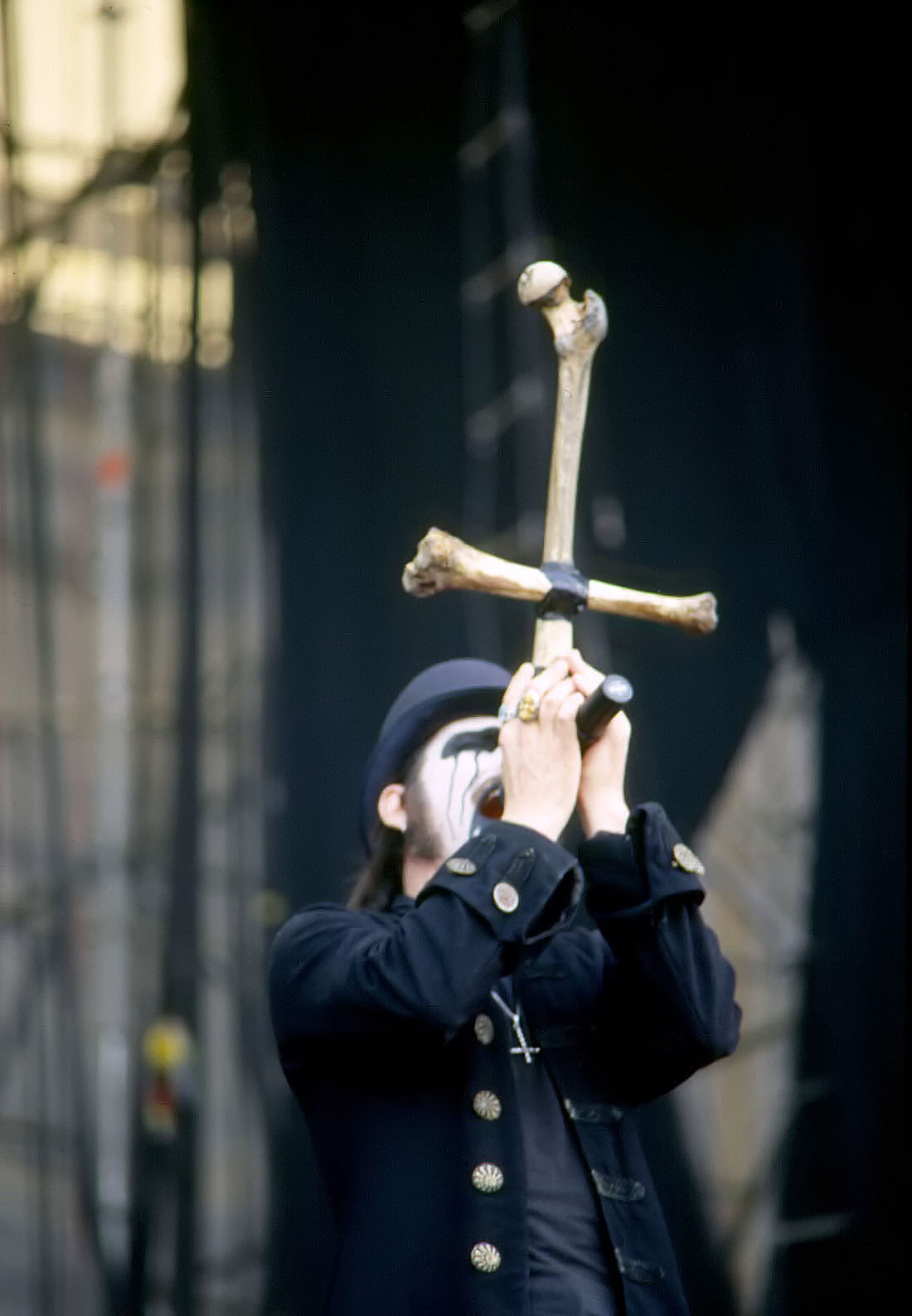
King Diamond in 1999

In 2000, Diamond decided to put Mercyful Fate on hold and continue on with his solo career.

On 1 August 2019, Mercyful Fate announced a reunion and an accompanying European tour. On 2 June 2022, Mercyful Fate performed their first live show since 1999 in Hanover as part of a European tour, where they debuted a brand new song titled "The Jackal of Salzbur." King Diamond also confirmed that the band was actively working on a new album. However, in January 2025 the band's bass player, Becky Baldwin, stated that the new Mercyful Fate album was not expected to be released before 2025, due to King Diamond's focus on his namesake band's upcoming thirteenth studio album.

=== King Diamond ===
After Mercyful Fate broke up, King Diamond, along with Michael Denner and Timi Hansen, formed the eponymous King Diamond band in 1985. Fatal Portrait, the band's first full-length studio album, was released on 14 March 1986, through Roadrunner Records. Their second album Abigail, was released on 29 May 1987 was the first concept album based on an original story by Diamond. Following some line up changes another concept album, "Them" charted at number 38 on the Swedish album chart, number 65 on the Dutch album chart, and at number 89 on the Billboard 200, making it King Diamond's highest charting album in the U.S. to date. Diamonds album a continuation of the storyline from "Them", Conspiracy was the first King Diamond album to be recorded in the United States and was released in 1989. The next album The Eye was released the following year in 1990, however King Diamond reunited with Mercyful Fate in 1992 where he would then balance recording and touring with both Mercyful Fate and his eponymous band throughout the 1990s. After recording and touring with Mercyful Fate, King Diamond reformed his eponymous band in 1994. Released on 1 October 1996, The Graveyard saw King Diamond return to writing concept albums this was then followed by 1998Voodoo. Then when Mercyful Fate was put on hold in 1999, King Diamond began recording the album House of God at the Nomad Recording Studio in Carrollton, Texas.

In 2001, King Diamond worked out a deal with the band Usurper to sing backup vocals on the song "Necronemesis" in exchange for them shifting their recording schedule around to accommodate the recording of Abigail II: The Revenge. In 2003 King Diamond released their eleventh album The Puppet Master, the album also featured additional vocals from Diamond's wife Livia Zita. In 2004, Diamond contributed vocals to "Sweet Dreams", the final track on the album of Dave Grohl's heavy metal side project Probot. In late 2005, Diamond appeared on the Roadrunner United – The All-Star Sessions album, contributing vocals for his song "In the Fire", which featured multiple Roadrunner Records musicians (past and present) working together to create individual songs. Diamond also guested on the Cradle of Filth song "Devil Woman" in late 2005.

In April 2006, Diamond reunited with Mikkey Dee (Motörhead drummer) at a sold-out gig at Kåren in Gothenburg, Sweden. In 2001 he referred to Dee as "one of the best drummers of all time and that's something that has bothered us since he left."

Diamond released his album Give Me Your Soul... Please, on 26 June 2007. The band received a Grammy nomination in the "Best Metal Performance" category for the track "Never Ending Hill".

He was forced to cancel a United States tour due to a herniated disk, causing severe back pain, which puts him in intense pain almost all of the time. He attributes the problem to the long stressful hours spent working on the album.

Diamond made an appearance at Ozzfest on 9 August 2008 at Frisco, Texas alongside Metallica, performing a medley of Mercyful Fate songs previously released on Metallica's Garage Inc. album. He also performed a cover of the Pantera song "A New Level" with Vinnie Paul, Scott Ian, Max Cavalera, and Nick Bowcott.

In 2009, Diamond was revealed to be a playable character for the rhythm game Guitar Hero: Metallica, appearing with Mercyful Fate's song "Evil". The player must complete the song on any instrument and any difficulty to unlock the character.

On 29 November 2010, Diamond was taken to the hospital, where doctors discovered several blockages in his arteries due to his heavy smoking habit. They determined that he had had several heart attacks and that he needed triple-bypass surgery, during which time he was medically dead for five hours. The surgery was performed successfully and on 11 December 2010 it was announced that he was at home recovering. All his musical projects were placed on hold.

On 7 December 2011, Diamond appeared on stage with Metallica at the Fillmore in San Francisco to celebrate Metallica's 30th anniversary.

In June 2012, Diamond performed his comeback concert at Sweden Rock Festival.

On Saturday 8 September 2012, Diamond appeared along with Mark Tremonti on VH1 Classic's That Metal Show discussing his surgery and various details about upcoming events.

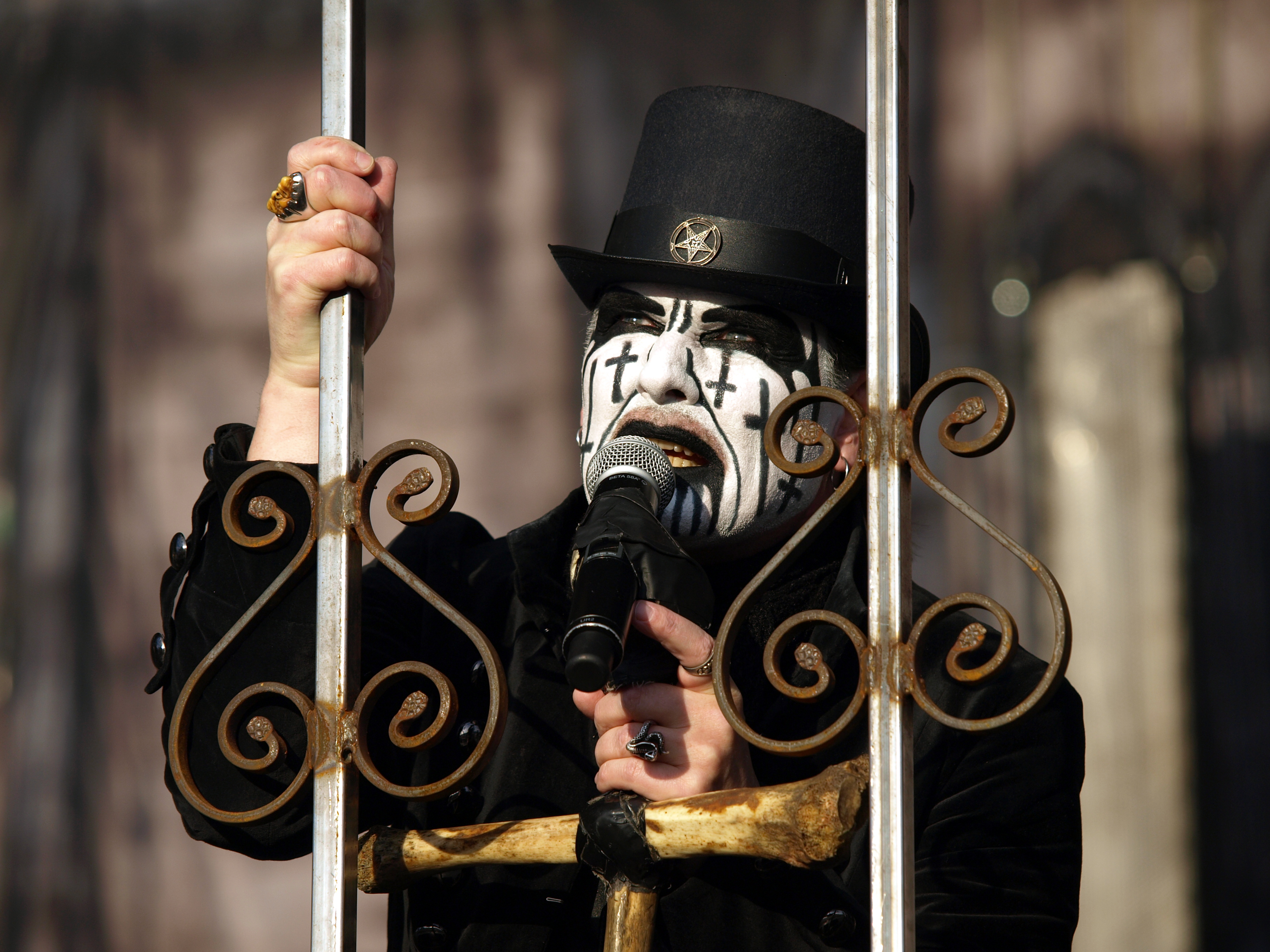
King Diamond in 2013

He appeared on Volbeat's 2013 album, Outlaw Gentlemen & Shady Ladies, providing guest vocals on the track "Room 24". This collaboration resulted in another Grammy nomination for Best Metal Performance at the 56th Annual Grammy Awards. In August 2013 Diamond performed at Open Air Bloodstock Festival, UK.

Slayer was chosen to headline the 2015 Rockstar Energy Mayhem Festival. The bands HELLYEAH, King Diamond, The Devil Wears Prada, Thy Art Is Murder, Jungle Rot, Sister Sin, Sworn In, Shattered Sun, Feed Her To The Sharks, Code Orange and Kissing Candice also participated in the Rockstar Tour.

In 2018, King Diamond began work on its thirteenth studio album, which would be divided into two parts to connect with its theme. The first part of the series was later revealed to be titled The Institute; the title has since been changed to Saint Lucifer's Hospital 1920. Originally intended for release in 2020, it faced multiple delays before its planned release in 2026. This delay was in part due to Diamond taking his time on perfecting new material by both the King Diamond band and the reunited Mercyful Fate.

In the spring and summer of 2025, King Diamond toured Europe, bringing along Paradise Lost, Angel Witch and Unto Others. In November of 2025 Diamond was honored by the Danish Arts Foundation and was given the lifetime honour for his "very special efforts and contributions to Danish art and cultural life." In addition Diamond will receive a yearly 189,000 Danish Krona (about $26,000) grant from the foundation for the rest of his life.

On September 12, 2026, Diamond joined My Chemical Romance on stage at the Alamodome in San Antonio, Texas to perform the song "Mama".

==== Other media ====
Diamond was a special celebrity guest star in four episodes of the Warner Bros. adult-oriented cartoon Metalocalypse as the Blues Devil, Ronald von Moldenberg, a fast food manager, and one of the Klokateers in 2006 on Adult Swim.

== Artistry ==
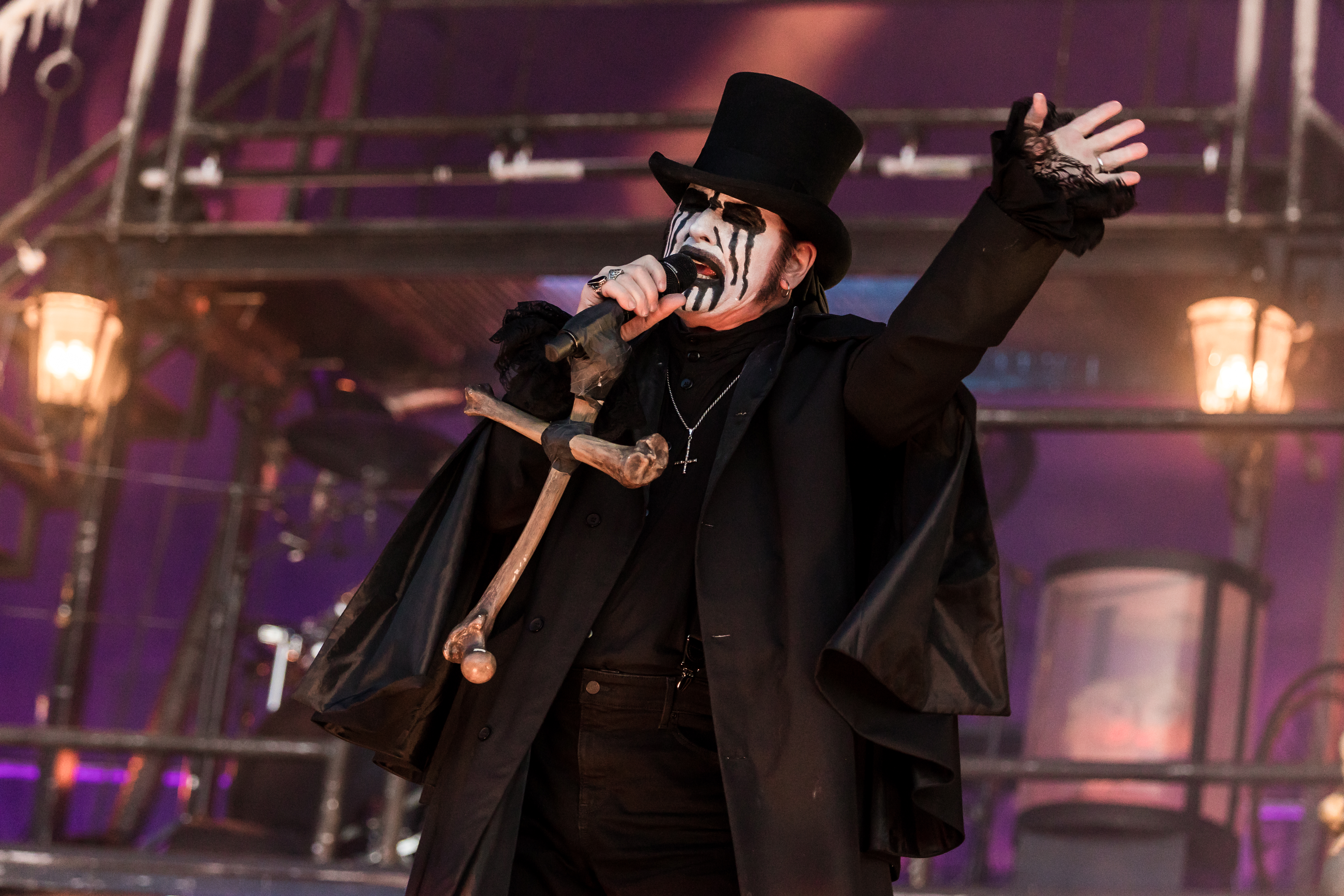
Diamond performing in Ballenstedt, Germany in 2025

Diamond is known for his multi-octave vocal range, in particular his far reaching and stable tone when singing in falsetto. Revolver wrote "the Danish metal royal has commanded our attention through Satan-summoning performances, demonic grunting and a glass-shattering falsetto that’s part Maria Callas, part Rob Halford and completely jaw-dropping."

He is known for creating conceptual works that feature recurring stories that include the supernatural, horror, fate and death. His lyrics have been described as a "gothic horror romance in metal form, delivered with technical precision and theatrical grandeur." Diamond has stated he has loved of horror films since his youth when he would watch Frankenstein and Dracula with his parents; these films have also played a part in his lyrical style. Diamond said that when he first joined Mercyful Fate, he lived in a apartment that "turned out to be truly haunted." He stated in an interview with Blabbermouth.net: "Many of the things that are written in the lyrics have been taken straight as they happened from these real experiences." In that same interview, he stated that a lot of his lyrics are drawn from real life, but some come from his imagination: "To make a story flow, you change some of the things that you've experienced. When an album is done and I read through all the lyrics, I get a little uneasy when I see how much of myself I've put into the stories. But then again, I know that no one's going to know unless I tell them exactly what's what, and I'm certainly not going to do that. But it's drawn from everywhere."

Diamond cites Arthur Brown, David Byron, Alice Cooper, Ronnie James Dio, Ian Gillan, Ozzy Osbourne and Robert Plant as his primary influences. According to Diamond's biography on his official website, the first two albums he bought were Deep Purple's Fireball and Black Sabbath's Master of Reality.

=== Stage presence ===
On stage, Diamond uses a microphone stand consisting of a femur bone and a tibia bone in the shape of a cross. He previously used a human skull, called Melissa, on stage. In the mid-1980s Melissa was stolen after a performance in the Netherlands. Diamond is also known for his Corpse paint and has changed the design of his make-up often over the years. With Conspiracy, he wore a mesh of black and white line war paint, with some red "blood" made to look like a wound coming out of his forehead. With his album The Puppet Master, he used very little white and mainly had black crosses and inverted crosses going up and down his face. Diamond is also known for his onstage performance. Brave Worlds described his stage presence stating "On stage, he transforms the concert into a dark theatre – a ritual where gothic tales, horrific characters and symbolic scenography merge. His distinctive "corpsepaint" and his microphone holder, an inverted cross made of human bones, make him an iconic figure."

In 1988, Diamond received a cease-and-desist letter from Kiss vocalist Gene Simmons claiming that Diamond's Corpse Paint looked too similar to Simmons' signature "Demon" make-up. The two never went to court over the matter with Diamond instead citing inspiration from Alice Cooper and Peter Gabriel rather then Simmons. He also noted that many artists used face paint long before KISS, meaning others could turn around and sue KISS just as easily.

== Personal life ==
Diamond is married to Livia Zita, a Hungarian-born singer who has made appearances as a backup vocalist on the albums The Puppet Master and Give Me Your Soul...Please, as well as during live performances. She is also his business partner, and is currently working with him to compile old footage for two planned DVD releases of King Diamond and Mercyful Fate live performances. She also helped him make remastered editions of the King Diamond albums The Spider's Lullabye, The Graveyard, Voodoo and House of God. In 2017, they became parents to a son, born in March. In a 2016 interview with Metal Hammer Diamond revealed that following his health scare he has given up smoking and started living a healthier life style, which he has credited to helping improve his singing voice. Some of Diamonds interest include Formula One and Football, growing up he played for the youth squad of Danish club called Hvidovre IF but he stopped playing once he went to college and started getting involved in music.

Although he was born and raised in Denmark, Diamond relocated to Dallas / Fort Worth, Texas in the 1980s. In 2010, Diamond officially quit smoking following his triple-bypass-surgery.

Diamond follows LaVeyan Satanism, which he does not see as a religion, but a philosophy by which he lived even before reading occultist Anton LaVey's The Satanic Bible. Michael Moynihan calls him "one of the only performers of the '80s Satanic Metal who was more than just a poseur using a devilish image for shock value". Diamond has expressed concern that religion has led so many people to kill and destroy each other. He stated that he cannot comprehend why religion has caused so much death and destruction when it is logically impossible to prove the presence or absence of any deity. He states that he has reached a point in his life where he has completely given up believing in anything religious. Despite being non religious Diamond revealed in a 2016, interview with Metal Hammer that he is "very spiritual."

== Legacy ==
Metallica released an 11-minute medley of five Mercyful Fate songs on their 1998 Garage Inc. cover album. King Diamond has provided guest vocals for live performances of the medley at Metallica's concerts on three occasions: at the 1999 Gods of Metal festival in Milan, Italy (with Hank Shermann on guitar); at the 2008 Ozzfest in Dallas, Texas; and at a 2011 Metallica fan club gig in San Francisco, California (with Hank Shermann on guitar, Michael Denner on guitar and Timi Hansen on bass).

King Diamond has appeared on the covers of many rock and metal magazines, and has influenced many artists, including Metallica's Lars Ulrich, Cradle of Filth, Cage, and Andy DiGelsomina of the Wagnerian opera metal project Lyraka.

American heavy metal band Cage devoted to him the song "King Diamond" on the album Hell Destroyer in 2007.

In 2006, Diamond was ranked at number 85 in Hit Parader's "Top 100 Metal Vocalists of All Time". In 2016 he was ranked number 38 on Loudwire’s list of the 66 Best Hard Rock and Metal Frontman of All Time.

King Diamond has inspired many bands; Metallica, Slayer, Opeth, Pantera, Cradle of Filth and Emperor have all cited him as a influence.

== Discography ==
- Fatal Portrait (1986)
- Abigail (1987)
- Them (1988)
- Conspiracy (1989)
- The Eye (1990)
- The Spider's Lullabye (1995)
- The Graveyard (1996)
- Voodoo (1998)
- House of God (2000)
- Abigail II: The Revenge (2002)
- The Puppet Master (2003)
- Give me your Soul...Please (2007)

== Awards ==
- 2008 – Grammy nomination in the "Best Metal Performance" category for the track "Never Ending Hill"
- 2014 — Grammy nomination in the "Best Metal Performance" category for the track "Room 24" (with Volbeat)
- 2015 — Abigail inducted into the Decibel Hall of Fame
- 2021 — "Them" inducted into the Decibel Hall of Fame
- 2025 — Danish Arts Foundation lifetime achievement
