= Paul David Harbour =

American musician

David Harbour
- Born: Paul David Harbour; May 24, 1965 (age 60); New Orleans, Louisiana, U.S.
- Genres: Hard rock, heavy metal, instrumental, progressive rock, shred, classical, new age, ambient
- Occupations: Musician, composer
- Instruments: Bass, guitar, piano, keyboards
- Years active: 1989–present
- Labels: Leviathan Records; Roadrunner Records; Massacre Records; M Records; Lion Music
- Website: pauldavidharbour.com

Paul David Harbour (born May 24, 1965) is an American bass guitar and guitar player, pianist and composer. He is recognised for his work with David T. Chastain, Michael Harris and Tony MacAlpine. He has played in the bands "Leather", "Chastain" and "King Diamond". He teaches bass guitar, guitar and piano.

== Education ==
Harbour began piano lessons at age five with the encouragement of his German paternal grandmother. Harbour's father had studied music and opera in Vanderbilt University's Peabody College of Education, Tennessee. At 16, Harbour was impressed by Edward Van Halen's performances and began bass guitar lessons. Harbour's prior lessons in classical and jazz piano assisted his guitar studies. Harbour studied funk, jazz and Motown bass lines. His desire to play the bass guitar came not only from his father but also from the music of Chris Squire from "Yes" and Geddy Lee from "Rush".

== Early career ==
At 17, Harbour played his first gig. He joined musicians who performed a repertoire of Top 40, College rock and covers. One of these musicians was Harbour's high school friend, Kevin White, who played the guitar. Together, they recorded some music. Harbour founded an instrumental trio called "Uncle Festre". Harbour obtained work as a studio session bassist for local musicians from Louisiana.

== Career ==
=== Manta Ray ===
In the late 1980s, Harbour joined the Dallas, Texas band "Manta Ray". The group was founded by Lance Harvill (who went on to the "Arms if the Sun" project) and included John Luke Hebert on drums and Mike Morgan a guitarist who became Lance's mentor. In 1990, "Manta Ray" recorded a demo album at the "Dallas Sound Lab" in classic hard 'n' heavy style.

=== Member of Chastain ===
In 1989, David T. Chastain, a guitarist invited Harbour to record bass parts on his instrumental solo album, Within The Heat. Harbour then joined Chastain's eponymous band, Chastain. In 1989, Harbour participated in the album, Shock Waves, a solo album by "Chastain's" vocalist, Leather Leone. In 1990, Harbour contributed to "Chastain's" album of classic heavy metal songs called For Those Who Dare. Harbour collaborated with David Chastain until the mid-1990s. Together, they recorded another two solo instrumental albums: Elegant Seduction (1991) and Next Planet Please (1994). These albums show a gradual departure from heavy metal music towards prog rock and fusion. While Harbour was a member, "Chastain" took three world tours.

=== Collaboration with Michael Harris ===
In June 1991, Chastain and Harris (who had played on the Leather album) collaborated to tour in the US and Mexico, record and release a concert album. Harbour recorded the rhythm section on Chastain's side and Greg Martin played drums on Harris' side. The resulting album, Live! Wild And Truly Diminished!!, was released in 1992. It contained concert versions of Harris' and Chastain's previous solo works and the concert improvisations of each. Harbour contributed to the album a solo bass guitar improvisation called B.O.F.. During the early 1990s, Harbour developed his pianistic skills and prepared his first solo album, with the working title, Lost For Words.

=== Member of King Diamond ===
"Chastain's" former drummer, John Luke Hebert, invited Harbour to play with his band King Diamond in 1999, as the bass guitar position was vacant. After a personal conversation with the band members, Harbour joined the group without further question. In 2000, he contributed bass guitar accompaniment to the band's album House Of God recorded at the "Nomad Recording Studio". "King Diamond" took a self-titled tour after which Harbour left the band.

=== Ideology ===
In 2003, Harbour's solo album, Ideology, was released on CD. Harbour composed music for the album, played piano and keyboard parts and bass guitar and took creative control, incorporating a number of different styles such as rock, jazz, prog rock, impressionism and new age. Influences evident in the album's music include George Winston, Tori Amos, Peter Gabriel, Kate Bush, Sting, and bands such as "Pink Floyd" and "Rush". Throughout the CD, the bass guitar contributes an independent melodic line in counterpoint to the piano, rather than just a simple rhythm accompaniment.

=== Gods of Balance ===
After the release of the Ideology CD, Harbour commenced work on Gods of Balance in collaboration with bass guitarist, Michael Manring. Despite Harbour needing time to promote Ideology (for example with a supporting tour), the new work commenced (as Manring was available). Harbour recorded bass guitar parts for Manring's new composition, Phobos and Deimos at "Castle Zeek Studio" in Austin, Texas. Beyond this, the Gods of Balance album was postponed for four years. During this time, Harbour explored musicianship and musical expression with the guitar, piano and fretless instruments.

=== Later work ===
During the 2000s, Harbour worked as a studio session bass guitar and piano player with various musicians including, the rock bands "Doppler Effect", "T ", the black metal band Absu, the darkwave/ambient project "Proscriptor", shred bass metal musician Ben Kuzay, and dark ambient band, Equimanthorn. In Dallas, in 2006, Harbour joined a local band, "49th Vibration". With an old friend, guitarist Troy Thibodeaux (ex-"Damaged Faith") and drummer April Samuels, Harbour played several club concerts and recorded a demo consisting of four songs in folk-pop-rock genre. Harbour has also played solo bass guitar and piano compositions in house concerts.

The Gingerman (bass solo, 2005)
Broken (piano solo, 2008)
Obelisk/Liberation (piano solo, 2008)
A Song That Doesn't Exist (Trip Wamsley, 2008)

In 2009, Harbour wrote Is it just me?. In 2010, he collaborated with Harris, Marco Minnemann drummer, Adam Nitti, Bunny Brunel and James Martin to record the album Tranz-Fused.

David left "49th Vibration" in 2011.

=== Lava Lamp ===
In December 2011, David Harbour shared with April Samuels ("49th Vibration") his new musical vision. From that moment David and April began rehearsing as a duo "Lava Lamp". David playing piano primarily, but at times acoustic guitar, and April playing a percussion/drum set, often working off one another through improvisational pieces.

== Discography ==
- David T. Chastain Within the Heat, 1989 (bass)
- Leather Shock Waves, 1989 (bass)
- Chastain For Those Who Dare, 1990 (bass)
- David T. Chastain Elegant Seduction, 1991 (bass)
- David T. Chastain & Michael Harris Live! Wild And Truly Diminished!, 1992 (bass, composer)
- David T. Chastain Next Planet Please, 1994 (bass)
- David T. Chastain Movements Thru Time (compilation), 1992 (bass)
- Michael Harris Ego Decimation Profile, 1996 (bass in Vicious Uppercut, Status-Fear, Julius Seizure, Freudian Trip, Terminus Epic)
- King Diamond House Of God, 2000 (bass)
- David Harbour Ideology, 2003 (bass, keyboards, composer)
- David T. Chastain Heavy Excursions (compilation), 2009 (bass)
- Michael Harris Tranz-Fused, 2010 (bass in Wizard of Odd, Professor Grunklesplat's Math Assignment)
- Manta Ray Visions Of Towering Alchemy (reissue), 2013 (bass)
- Chastain & Harris Live! Collision Course!!, 2018 (bass, composer)

=== Other works ===
- Manta Ray Until Tomorrow (demo tape), 1990 (bass)
- DVinity Symbols Become Rituals, 1996 (bass, composer)
- DVinity You Decide, 2000 (bass, composer)
- Doppler Effect Duplicitous Vortex, 2001 (bass)
- Absu Tara, 2001 (keyboards and piano)
- Proscriptor Thoth Music(k) (vinyl EP), 2004 (bass in The 4 Horsemen, Epod No Sknup Etihw)
- Equimanthorn Second Sephira Cella, 2004 (aka Vordhk Dzokhk, fretless bass)
- 49th Vibration Demo Tape, 2007 (bass in Lisas Song, The Same One, Is This It, Victim)
- Ben Kuzay Perpetual Reign, 2009 (bass and keyboards in Homage to Hated Heroes)
- Absu Absu, 2009 (keyboards in B. Our Earth of Black (Part II of …Of the Dead Who Never Rest in Their Tombs Are the Attendance of Familiar Spirits…)

== Training materials ==
- Learn How To Learn, 1993 (video tutorial for bass players)

== Influences ==
Van Halen, Rush, Geddy Lee, Chris Squire, Billy Sheehan, Stuart Hamm, Pink Floyd, Peter Gabriel, George Winston, Tori Amos, Kate Bush, Sting
