= Ideology (album) =

Studio album by David Harbour
- Released: 2003
- Recorded: 2002–2003
- Genres: Instrumental, new age, fusion
- Length: 43:59
- Labels: M Records, Maximedia
- Producers: David Harbour and Maximedia

David Harbour chronology
King Diamond "House Of God" (2000)	Ideology (2003)	Paul David Harbour "God of Balance" (2011)

Ideology is the first instrumental solo album by American musician and composer David Harbour.

== History ==
During the 80's–90's, David Harbour was well known to the listeners as a virtuoso bass player of David T. Chastain, Michael Harris and Tony MacAlpine bands, as well as a participant of Leather and Chastain bands. In the mid-nineties Harbour began to pay more attention to the piano, his first musical instrument, which he began to play as early as five years of age. Several years of work in this direction resulted in that in the late nineties, David Harbour decided to implement some of many musical ideas he got in his arsenal, in the form of an instrumental solo album. According to the information from an older version of his site, the original working title of his forthcoming album was Lost for Words.

The recording itself of the album was delayed for some time, due to the fact that in late 1999, David received an invitation to join King Diamond group. After recording with this group its album House of God (2000) and the completion of the tour in support of it, Harbour left King Diamond and started working seriously on his own solo album. He placed two demos on his official website and said that besides being a composer and a bass guitarist he was also going to play all keyboard and piano parts on this album. The first solo album of David Harbour was released in the beginning of 2003. The disc named Ideology presented ten instrumental tracks composed by David.

== Style and mood ==
With the release of Ideology album, David Harbour completely changed the established view of himself as a musician and a performer. Despite logical expectations to get a solo album of a virtuoso bass player, the audience was presented a work of a strong pianist and composer, where bass served only as another melodic voice. There are also three purely piano pieces in the album: "Liberation", "Broken" and "Obelisk", in which David plays as if he were trying to break bars – a sure sign of musical impressionism.

On his first solo work, David Harbour easily avoided virtually all musical limits, demonstrating the possibility of combining the most differentiate musical styles. On Ideology, elements of rock music, jazz, progressive rock, impressionism, and new age are harmoniously interwoven. However, the term "fusion" is not a good definition in this case because the compositions of Harbour are made in more "atmospheric" key, with more influence of art rock, progressive and classic music than of jazz.

== Track listing ==
All music is composed by David Harbour.

No.	Title	Length
1.	"Liberation"	01:44
2.	"Dollersheim"	03:29
3.	"Counting on Gravity"	06:32
4.	"Discipline"	03:58
5.	"Judas"	04:46
6.	"Broken"	05:49
7.	"Swimming with Sharks"	06:13
8.	"Supermodel"	03:14
9.	"Obelisk"	04:58
10.	"Immortal"	05:16

== Personnel ==
- David Harbour – bass guitar, keyboard, piano
- Dmitri Thomann – guitar (nylon)
- Eddie Head – guitar (electric)
- Keith Anderson – saxophone
- Rob Stankiewicz – drums

== Video ==
There are concert versions of solo piano compositions from Ideology album performed by David Harbour available on YouTube:

- "Broken"
- "Obelisk" / "Liberation"

== Sources ==
- "Groove Of The Month". Bass Player. April 2003. Archived from the original on March 9, 2016 – via HighBeam Research.
- MusicBox, №(1) 31 2004 «Bass Guitar Heroes»
