= Abzu (disambiguation) =

Abzu is the primeval sea below the void space of the underworld in ancient Mesopotamian belief.

Abzu, Abžu, or Abzû may also refer to:

- Abžu, a dialect of the Abkhaz language
- Abzû, a 2016 adventure video game
- Abzu (album), a 2011 album by Absu
- Austin Peay State University
