= Nornagest =

Vocalist (born 1977)

- Born: Régis Lant; 10 June 1977 (age 49)
- Origin: United Kingdom
- Genres: Black metal
- Occupations: Singer, writer

Régis Lant (born 10 June 1977), better known as Nornagest, is a vocalist and writer, best known for his vocal works with the black metal band Enthroned and Absu's self-titled release.

His career started in the Belgian metal band Heresia. In 1995, Nornagest was invited to join Enthroned on their first album Prophecies of Pagan Fire but declined the offer. The album became one of the cult albums of the genre, even though some fans consider previous vocalist Sabathan's vocals hard to handle. Shortly after the recording of the album, Nornagest joined the band as the lead guitarist anyway.

In 2007, Nornagest took over vocals duties in Enthroned after previous vocalist Sabathan decided to quit the band.

== Personal life ==
Nornagest has an English background and is the cousin of Conrad "Cronos" Lant, lead singer of the cult black metal band Venom. This is mentioned by his cousin Anthony Lant drummer of Defcon-One in an interview he did with metalunderground in April 2012. He currently resides in Dendermonde, Belgium.

He describes himself as a follower of the left-hand path and practitioner of scorpionic magick.

== Discography ==
- Heresia: Fall into Dementia (1992)
- Infected: Progress Legacy (1994)
- The Beast: Pacta Conventa Doemoniorum (1996)
- Enthroned: Towards the Skullthrone of Satan (1997)
- Enthroned: Regie Sathanas (1998)
- The Beast: Him (1998)
- Enthroned: The Apocalypse Manifesto (1999)
- Enthroned: P-2000 (2000)
- Enthroned: Armoured Bestial Hell (2000)
- The Beast: Fixed by the Devil (2002)
- Enthroned: Carnage in Worlds Beyond (2002)
- Enthroned: Goatlust (2003)
- Plague: Vision of the Twilight (2003)
- Enthroned: XES Haereticum (2004)
- Enthroned: Black Goat Ritual (2005)
- Antaeus: Blood Libels (2006) Lyrics
- Enthroned: Tetra Karcist (2007)
- Grabak: Agash Daeva (2007) as guest vocalist
- Demonizer: Tryumphator (2008) as guest vocalist
- Absu: Absu (2009) as guest vocalist
- Enthroned: Pentagrammaton (2010)
- Enthroned: Obsidium (2012)
- Enthroned: Sovereigns (2014)
- Enthroned: Cold Black Suns (2019)

== Bibliography ==
- The Spiritual Significance of Music (2010), Justin St Vincent Publishings
- Qliphoth; Flesh Totems and Mask Bones (2012), Aeon Sophia Press
- Sethnakht and the XXth Dynasty (2014), self-released
