= Absu =

Absu or ABSU may refer to:

- ABSU or All Bodo Students' Union, a students' organisation in Assam
- Absu (band), a metal band
  - Absu (album), 2009 album by the band Absu
- Abzu, Mesopotamian deity also known as Absu
- Abia State University in Abia, Nigeria
- Absu, an area in Axiom Verge
