= Shock Waves (Leather Leone album) =

Studio album by Leather Leone
- Released: 1989
- Recorded: Counterpoint Creative Studios and Leviathan Studios, Cincinnati, Ohio, Prairie Sun Recording Studios, Cotati, California
- Genre: Heavy metal
- Length: 40:03
- Label: Leviathan / Roadrunner
- Producer: David T. Chastain

Leather Leone chronology
| The Voice of the Cult (1986) | Shock Waves (1989) | For Those Who Dare (1990) |

Professional ratings
Review scores
| Source | Rating |
|---|---|
| AllMusic | 4/5 stars |
| Collector's Guide to Heavy Metal | 6/10 |

Shock Waves is the first solo studio album by the American singer Leather Leone, better known for being the front woman of the American heavy metal band Chastain from 1984 to 1991. The album was released in 1989 through David T. Chastain's own label Leviathan Records.

== Track listing ==
1. "All Your Neon" (Leather Leone, Pat O'Brien) – 4:24
2. "The Battlefield of Life" (David T. Chastain) - 5:39
3. "Shock Waves" (Mark Shelton) - 4:14
4. "In a Dream" (Chastain, Leone) - 5:22
5. "Something in This Life" (Leone, O'Brien) - 4:10
6. "Diamonds Are for Real" (Chastain) - 3:54
7. "It's Still in Your Eyes" (Chastain) - 3:58
8. "Catastrophic Heaven" (Chastain, Leone) - 3:42
9. "No Place Called Home" (Chastain, Leone) - 4:41

== Personnel ==
=== Musicians ===
- Leather Leone - vocals
- Michael Harris - guitars
- David Harbour - bass
- John Luke Herbert - drums

=== Production ===
- David T. Chastain - producer, keyboards
- Steve Fontano - engineer, mixing
- Dale "Smitty" Smith - engineer
- Jamie King - mastering
- Matthew H. Rudzinski - executive producer, project coordinator
