= Sick Society =

Studio album by Chastain
- Released: 26 September 1995
- Studio: Audiocraft Studios, Cincinnati, Ohio, Davenhill Studios and Leviathan Studios, Atlanta, Georgia, Twelvetone Studios, Sacramento, California
- Genre: Heavy metal
- Length: 61:42
- Label: Leviathan
- Producer: David T. Chastain, Kate French

Chastain chronology
For Those Who Dare (1990)	Sick Society (1995)	In Dementia (1997)

Professional ratings
Review scores
Source	Rating
AllMusic	3/5 stars
Collector's Guide to Heavy Metal	6/10

Sick Society is the sixth studio album by the American heavy metal band Chastain, released in 1995 through Leviathan Records. It is the first album after five years released by David T. Chastain under the name Chastain and the first to feature the singer Kate French, who replaced Leather Leone.

== Track listing ==
All songs by David T. Chastain and Kate French, except tracks 1, 2, 6, 7 by David T. Chastain

1. "I Know the Darkness" – 5:16
2. "Sick Society" – 4:55
3. "Violence in Blame" – 5:59
4. "Those Were the Daze" – 4:47
5. "Destructive Ground" – 4:58
6. "To the Edge" – 5:20
7. "The Price of War" – 4:16
8. "Every Emotion" – 5:08
9. "The Vampire" – 5:21
10. "Sugarcaine" – 4:52
11. "Love and Hate" – 3:46
12. "Angel Falls" – 7:04

== Personnel ==
=== Band members ===
- Kate French — lead and backing vocals, rhythm guitar, bass, keyboards, co-producer
- David T. Chastain — lead and rhythm guitars, guitar synth, acoustic guitar, bass, keyboards, backing vocals, producer
- Dennis Lesh — drums, keyboards

=== Production ===
- Jeff Higgins — engineer, mixing
- David Shew — engineer, digital editing
