= The Devil's Mistress (disambiguation) =

The Devil's Mistress is the North American release name of the 2008 British television miniseries The Devil's Whore.

The Devil's Mistress may also refer to:

- Dancing With the Devil's Mistress, a song on the 2001 David T. Chastain album Rock Solid Guitar
- The Devil's Mistress, a 1982 novel by British author Sarah Holland
- The Devil's Mistress, a 1991 novel by American author Heather Graham Pozzessere
- The Devil's Mistress, a 1997 book by American author Alison Leslie Gold
- The Devil's Mistress, a 2016 Czech film about Joseph Goebbels' onetime mistress Lída Baarová
- Riding With the Devil's Mistress, a 2003 novel by American author Peter Brandvold
- Witchcraft VI: The Devil's Mistress, a 1994 horror film
