= Tara (Absu album) =

Studio album by Absu
- Released: May 23, 2001
- Recorded: September–December 2000, NOMAD studios, Carrollton, Texas
- Genres: Black metal, thrash metal
- Length: 52:02
- Label: Osmose
- Producers: Kol Marshall & Absu

Absu chronology
In the Eyes of Ioldánach (1998)	Tara (2001)	Mythological Occult Metal: 1991–2001 (2005)

Professional ratings
Review scores
Source	Rating
Allmusic	3.5/5 stars

Tara is the fourth album by blackened thrash metal band Absu. It was released on May 23, 2001, by Osmose Productions. A remastered edition was supposed to come out in September 2007, but was delayed until March 2009. It contains the In the Eyes of Ioldánach EP as bonus tracks. Early promotional material for the album stated that Mike Scaccia of Rigor Mortis/Ministry fame would contribute to the album but that did not occur. In addition, King Diamond did contribute vocals to the album but could not be credited due to contractual restrictions. He is credited as Masthema Mazziqim, a pseudonym used by the singer of Dolmen, a band that eventually became Absu.

In 2013, Decibel ranked Tara at number 46 on its list of the Top 100 Black Metal Albums of All Time.

== Track listing ==
All music composed by Shaftiel, except "Tara" and "Tara (Recapitulation)" by Sir Don Shannon.

Phase One: "Ioldánach's Pedagogy"

1. "Tara" – 1:57
2. "Pillars of Mercy" – 4:22
3. "A Shield with an Iron Face" – 3:22
4. "Manannán" – 6:39
5. "The Cognate House of Courtly Witches Lies West of County Meath" – 4:19
6. "She Cries the Quiet Lake" – 4:11
7. "Yrp Lluyddawc" – 1:52

Phase Two: "The Cythraul Klan's Scrutiny"

8. "From Ancient Times (Starless Skies Burn to Ash)" – 3:54
9. "Four Crossed Wands (Spell 181)" – 4:47
10. "Vorago (Spell 182)" – 5:46
11. "Bron (Of the Waves)" – 1:32
12. "Stone of Destiny (...For Magh Slécht and Ard Righ)" – 7:47
13. "Tara (Recapitulation)" – 1:46

2009 Digipack Re-Release Bonus Tracks

14. "V.I.T.R.I.O.L."
15. "Hallstatt"
16. "Manannán"
17. "Never Blow Out the Eastern Candle"

== Personnel ==
=== Absu ===
- Shaftiel – lead, rhythm, acoustic & bass guitars, voice
- Equitant Ifernain – electric bass
- Sir Proscriptor McGovern – voices, drums, percussion and analog synthesizers

=== Additional personnel ===
- Sir Don Shannon – Bagpipes
- Sir Vincent Rossi – Acoustic Guitar, Mandolin
- David Harbour – Additional Keyboards and Piano
- King Diamond (credited as "Masthema Mazziqim") – Additional Vocals
- Ronnie Trent – Additional Vocals
- Ashmedi (Melechesh) – Additional Vocals

=== Production ===
- Arranged by Absu
- Produced by Absu & Kol Marshall
