= Arameans in Palestine =

Term "Arameans in Palestine" can have different meanings:

- Ancient Arameans in historical Palestine
- Modern Assyrians in the State of Palestine
