= Mystery of Illusion =

Studio album by Chastain
- Released: 1985
- Recorded: Prairie Sun Recording Studios in Cotati, California
- Genre: Heavy metal
- Length: 36:57
- Label: Shrapnel
- Producer: Peter Marrino, Mike Varney

Chastain chronology
Mystery of Illusion (1985)	Ruler of the Wasteland (1986)

Professional ratings
Review scores
Source	Rating
AllMusic	3/5 stars
Collector's Guide to Heavy Metal	4/10
Metal Forces	8/10

Mystery of Illusion is the debut studio album by American heavy metal band Chastain, released in 1985 by Shrapnel Records.

== Track listing ==
All tracks are written by David T. Chastain, except where noted.

Side one
No.	Title	Length
1.	"Black Knight"	3:22
2.	"When the Battle's Over"	3:42
3.	"Mystery of Illusion" (Chastain, Russell Jenkins)	4:31
4.	"I've Seen Tomorrow"	3:01
5.	"Endlessly"	3:25

Side two
No.	Title	Length
6.	"I Fear No Evil"	4:37
7.	"Night of the Gods"	5:09
8.	"We Shall Overcome"	3:53
9.	"The Winds of Change" (Chastain, Jenkins)	5:17
Total length:		36:57

== Personnel ==
=== Band members ===
- Leather Leone – vocals
- David T. Chastain – guitar
- Mike Skimmerhorn – bass
- Fred Coury – drums

=== Additional credits ===
- Peter Marrino – arrangement, production
- Steve Fontano – engineering, mixing
- George Horn – mastering
- Mike Varney – executive production
