= Mythological Occult Metal: 1991–2001 =

Compilation album (studio/live) by Absu
- Released: 2005
- Genre: Black metal, thrash metal, death metal
- Label: Osmose

Absu chronology
Tara (2001)	Mythological Occult Metal: 1991–2001 (2005)	Absu (2009)

Professional ratings
Review scores
Source	Rating
Allmusic	4/5 stars

Absu's compilation album released in 2005 by Osmose Productions. The vinyl release was limited to 500 copies.

== Track listing ==
Disc 1

1. "The Gold Torques of Uláid"
2. "Never Blow Out the Eastern Candle"
3. "Stone of Destiny" (Edit Version)
4. "Immortal Sorcery"
5. "Sumerian Sands (The Silence)"
6. "Disembodied"
7. "...And Shineth Unto the Cold Cometh (Including Prelusion to Cythrául)
8. "Akhera Goiti -- Akhera Beiti (One Black Opalith for Tomorrow)"
9. "Reliquiae Celticae"
10. "The Great Battle Moving from Ideal to Actual"
11. "Old Tombs at Hochdorf"

Disc 2

1. "Deathcrush (Including Silvester Anfang)"
2. "Swing of the Axe"
3. "Transylvania"
4. "Bestial Invasion"
5. "Winter Zephyr (...Within Kingdoms of Mist)" (Live)
6. "Highland Tyrant Attack" (Live)
7. "The Thrice Is Greatest to Ninnigal" (Live)
8. "The Coming of War" (Live)
9. "Book of Splendour" (Rehearsal)
10. "Tasseomancy" (Rehearsal)

== Credits ==
Disc 1

- Track 1: from the Gummo soundtrack
- Track 2: from World Domination Sampler CD (alternate version)
- Track 3: from Tara (alternate version)
- Tracks 4–6: The Temples of Offal 7-inch demo
- Tracks 7–8: ...And Shineth Unto the Cold Cometh... 7-inch EP
- Tracks 9–11: Hallstattian Swords 7-inch (unreleased EP)

Disc 2

- Track 1: from Tribute to Mayhem: Originators of the Northern Darkness
- Track 2: from Tribute to Possessed: Seven Gates of Horror
- Track 3: from Tribute to Iron Maiden: A Call to Irons
- Track 4: band rehearsal – May 10, 1996, in Carrollton, Texas
- Track 5: recorded live April 28, 1997, in Toulouse, France
- Track 6: recorded live April 28, 1997, in Toulouse, France
- Track 7: recorded live April 29, 1995, in Torino, Italy
- Track 8: recorded live April 26, 1995, in Essen, Germany
- Track 9: band rehearsal – October 23, 1993, in Dallas, Texas (unreleased track)
- Track 10: band rehearsal – October 31, 1993, in Dallas, Texas (unreleased track)
