= Barathrum: V.I.T.R.I.O.L. =

Studio album by Absu
- Released: December 1, 1993
- Recorded: 1993
- Genre: Blackened death metal
- Length: 30:50
- Labels: Gothic, Osmose
- Producer: Absu

Absu chronology
Barathrum: V.I.T.R.I.O.L. (1993)	The Sun of Tiphareth (1995)

Barathrum: V.I.T.R.I.O.L. is the debut album of American black metal band Absu. It was released on December 1, 1993 via Gothic Records, and re-released in 1994 by Osmose Productions with three bonus tracks. It would be reissued once more in 2011 by The Crypt Records, as a boxset containing 3 discs — the first disc contains the album itself plus the three live tracks from the Osmose Productions re-issue; the second disc contains alternate versions of the tracks "Descent to Acheron", "An Equinox of Fathomless Disheartenment", "The Thrice Is Greatest to Ninnigal", "Infinite and Profane Thrones" and "Fantasizing to the Third of the Pagan Visions"; and the third disc contains the Temples of Offal EP, the Return of the Ancients demo, and the track "Abhorred Xul", composed when Absu was still called Azathoth.

"Barathrum" is a word in Latin (derived from the Greek βάραθρον — várathron) meaning "gulch", or "deep, dark hole", while "V.I.T.R.I.O.L." is an acronym for "Visita Interiora Terræ Rectificando Invenies Occultum Lapidem", an alchemic motto that can be roughly translated as "Visit the interior of the earth and [by] purifying [yourself] you will find the hidden stone".

== Track listing ==
All lyrics are written by Proscriptor; all music is composed by Absu.

No.	Title	Length
1.	"An Involution of Thorns"	3:08
2.	"Descent to Acheron (Evolving into the Progression of Woe)"	4:33
3.	"An Equinox of Fathomless Disheartenment"	3:13
4.	"The Thrice Is Greatest to Ninnigal"	5:00
5.	"Infinite and Profane Thrones"	6:20
6.	"Fantasizing to the Third of the Pagan Visions (Quoth the Sky, 'Nevermore': Act II)"	5:27
7.	"An Evolution of Horns"	3:09

Osmose Productions 1994 re-issue bonus tracks
No.	Title	Length
8.	"The Coming of War" (live in Belgium, April 21, 1993)	5:10
9.	"The Thrice Is Greatest to Ninnigal" (live in Germany, April 26, 1993)	5:10
10.	"Never Blow Out the Eastern Candle" (live in Belgium, April 21, 1993)	5:30

== Credits ==
Recorded album

- Shaftiel – guitars, vocals
- David Athron Mystica – guitar
- Black Massith – keyboards, synthesizers
- Equitant – bass and effects
- Proscriptor – drums, percussion, vocals and lyrics
- Lynette Mitchell – additional backing vocals on "Descent to Acheron"

Bonus live songs

- Proscriptor – drums, vocals
- Shaftiel – guitars, vocals
- Equitant – guitars
- Mezzadurus (Bloodstorm) – lead vocals, bass

=== Production ===
- Arranged & produced by Absu
- Engineered & mixed by Danny Brown & Brian McCurry
- Mastered by Danny Brown
