= In an Outrage =

Studio album by Chastain
- Released: 6 July 2004
- Studio: Swirlink Studios, Vallejo, California, Leviathan Studios, Atlanta, Georgia, Trident Studios, Pacheco, California, Big White Studios, Alameda, California
- Genre: Heavy metal
- Length: 52:04
- Label: Leviathan
- Producer: David T. Chastain

Chastain chronology
In Dementia (1997)	In an Outrage (2004)	The Reign of Leather (2010)

Professional ratings
Review scores
Source	Rating
Metal Rules	4/5 stars
Lords of Metal	8.2/10

In an Outrage is the eighth studio album by American heavy metal band Chastain, released in 2004 through Leviathan Records. The album was reissued in Europe by Massacre Records in 2006.

== Track listing ==
All songs by David T. Chastain and Kate French

1. "In an Outrage" – 5:13
2. "Malicious Pigs" – 4:59
3. "Lucky to Be Alive" – 4:56
4. "Souls the Sun" – 6:02
5. "Bullet from a Gun" – 4:06
6. "Women Are Wicked" – 5:15
7. "Tortured Love" – 4:29
8. "New Beginnings" – 5:07
9. "Rule the World" – 5:49
10. "Hamunaptra" – 6:08

=== Japanese edition bonus tracks ===
11. "Human Sacrifice" – 6:10
12. "Seven" – 6:30
13. "Long and Tortured Love" – 6:26

=== Korean edition bonus tracks ===
11. "In an Outrage" (alternative version) – 5:02
12. "Bleeding Heart" – 2:29

== Personnel ==
=== Band members ===
- Kate French – lead and backing vocals
- David T. Chastain – guitars, backing vocals, engineer, producer
- Dave Starr – bass
- Larry Howe – drums, backing vocals

=== Production ===
- Juan Ortega, London Wilde – engineers
- Christian Schmid – mixing, mastering
