= The 7th of Never =

- Cover art by Guy Aitchison

Studio album by Chastain
- Released: June 1987
- Recorded: 1986
- Studios: Counterpoint Creative Studios, Cincinnati, Ohio; Steve Lawson Studios, Seattle, Washington, Prairie Sun Recording Studios, Cotati, California,
- Genres: Heavy metal, power metal
- Length: 42:27
- Label: Leviathan
- Producer: David T. Chastain

Chastain chronology
Ruler of the Wasteland (1986)	The 7th of Never (1987)	The Voice of the Cult (1988)

Professional ratings
Review scores
Source	Rating
AllMusic	2/5 stars
Collector's Guide to Heavy Metal	5/10
Crash	5/6
Kerrang!	4/5 stars

The 7th of Never is the third studio album by the American heavy metal band Chastain, released in 1987 through David T. Chastain's own record label Leviathan Records in the USA. In Europe the album was reissued by Massacre Records in 1995. The band members lived in different locations in the United States and recorded in different studios their parts, which were later mixed by Steve Fontano at Prairie Sun Studios in California.

== Track listing ==
All songs by David T. Chastain, except "The Wicked Are Restless" by Chastain and Leather Leone

Side one

1. "We Must Carry On" – 3:37*
2. "Paradise" – 4:12
3. "It's Too Late for Yesterday" – 4:49
4. "827" (instrumental) – 3:22
5. "The Wicked Are Restless" – 5:37

Side two

6. "The 7th of Never" – 4:51
7. "Take Me Back in Time" – 4:50
8. "Feel His Magic" – 5:05
9. "Forevermore" – 6:03
- Some CD's have a shorter version of "We Must Carry On" that fades out and runs 3:26.

== Personnel ==
=== Band members ===
- Leather Leone – vocals
- David T. Chastain – guitars, producer
- Mike Skimmerhorn – bass
- Ken Mary – drums

=== Production ===
- Dale Smith – guitar and bass recording engineer
- Terry Date – drums recording engineer
- Steve Fontano – vocals recording engineer, mixing
- George Horn – mastering at Fantasy Studios, Berkeley, California
