= The Third Storm of Cythraul =

Studio album by Absu
- Released: January 27, 1997
- Genre: Black metal, thrash metal
- Length: 45:04
- Label: Osmose
- Producer: Absu

Absu chronology
The Sun of Tiphareth (1995)	The Third Storm of Cythraul (1997)	In the Eyes of Ioldánach (1998)

Professional ratings
Review scores
Source	Rating
Allmusic	4/5 stars

The Third Storm of Cythraul is the third full-length studio album by metal band Absu. It was released on Osmose Productions in 1997.

== Track listing ==
- All songs written & arranged by Absu, except where noted.
1. "Prelusion to Cythraul featuring ...And Shineth Unto the Cold Cometh..." – 6:48
2. "Highland Tyrant Attack" – 4:48
3. "A Magician's Lapis-Lazuli" – 3:08
4. "Swords and Leather" – 3:08
5. "The Winter Zephyr (...Within Kingdoms of Mist)" – 2:59
6. "Morbid Scream" – 2:10 (Trent White)
7. "Customs of Tasseomancy (Quoth the Sky, Nevermore - Act I)" – 3:59
8. "Intelligence Towards the Crown" – 1:56
9. "...Of Celtic Fire, We Are Born/Terminus (...In the Eyes of Ioldánach)" – 8:32

Digipak Bonus Track

10. "Akhera Goiti - Akhera Beiti (One Black Opalith for Tomorrow)" – 7:26

== Personnel ==
- Shaftiel – electric lead & bass guitars, acoustic guitars, voice
- Equitant Ifernain – electric lead & bass guitars
- Proscriptor McGovern – drums, percussion, gong, bells & voice

=== Production ===
- Arranged & produced by Absu
- Executive producer: Osmose Productions
- Recorded & engineered by Absu & Alex Gerst
- Assistant engineer: Gary Long
- Edited & mastered by Peter Clark
