= Melechesh =

Black metal band

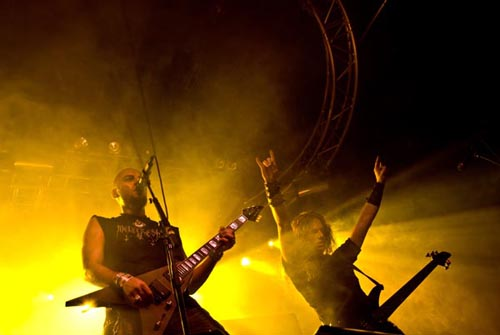
- Live at Hole in the Sky in Norway, 2007

Background information
- Origin: Jerusalem
- Genres: Black metal, oriental metal
- Years active: 1993–present
- Labels: Nuclear Blast, Osmose, The End, Profound Lore Records
- Members: Ashmedi; Moloch; Lord Curse
- Website: melechesh.com

Melechesh is an ethnically Assyrian black metal band formed in Jerusalem and currently based in Amsterdam. Ashmedi started the band as a solo project in 1993. The following year, guitarist Moloch and drummer Lord Curse joined the line-up. The band's goal was to play black metal with Middle Eastern influences based on Assyrian (Mesopotamian) and occult themes. The band described their sound as "Mesopotamian metal" or "Sumerian Black Thrashing Metal". They are sometimes referred to as oriental metal.

== Background ==
=== Name etymology and pronunciation ===
The name Melechesh is a portmanteau of two Hebrew and Aramaic words: melech (king; מֶלֶךְ, ܡܲܠܟܵܐ) and esh (fire; אֵשׁ); i.e., king of fire or fiery king.

The digraph ch is pronounced similarly to the Scottish ch, as in loch, or the Greek letter Χ. The Modern Hebrew realization of it is the voiceless uvular fricative (/χ/). See Modern Hebrew phonology and Aramaic phonology. An accepted and common English pronunciation is me-lek-ESH (/ˌmɛləkˈɛʃ/).

=== Geographical origins ===
The band started in Jerusalem and Bethlehem, where most Palestinian Assyrians and many Palestinian Armenians live, and operated from there between 1993 and 1998. They have resided mainly in Amsterdam since 1998 for personal, professional and demographic reasons.

== History ==
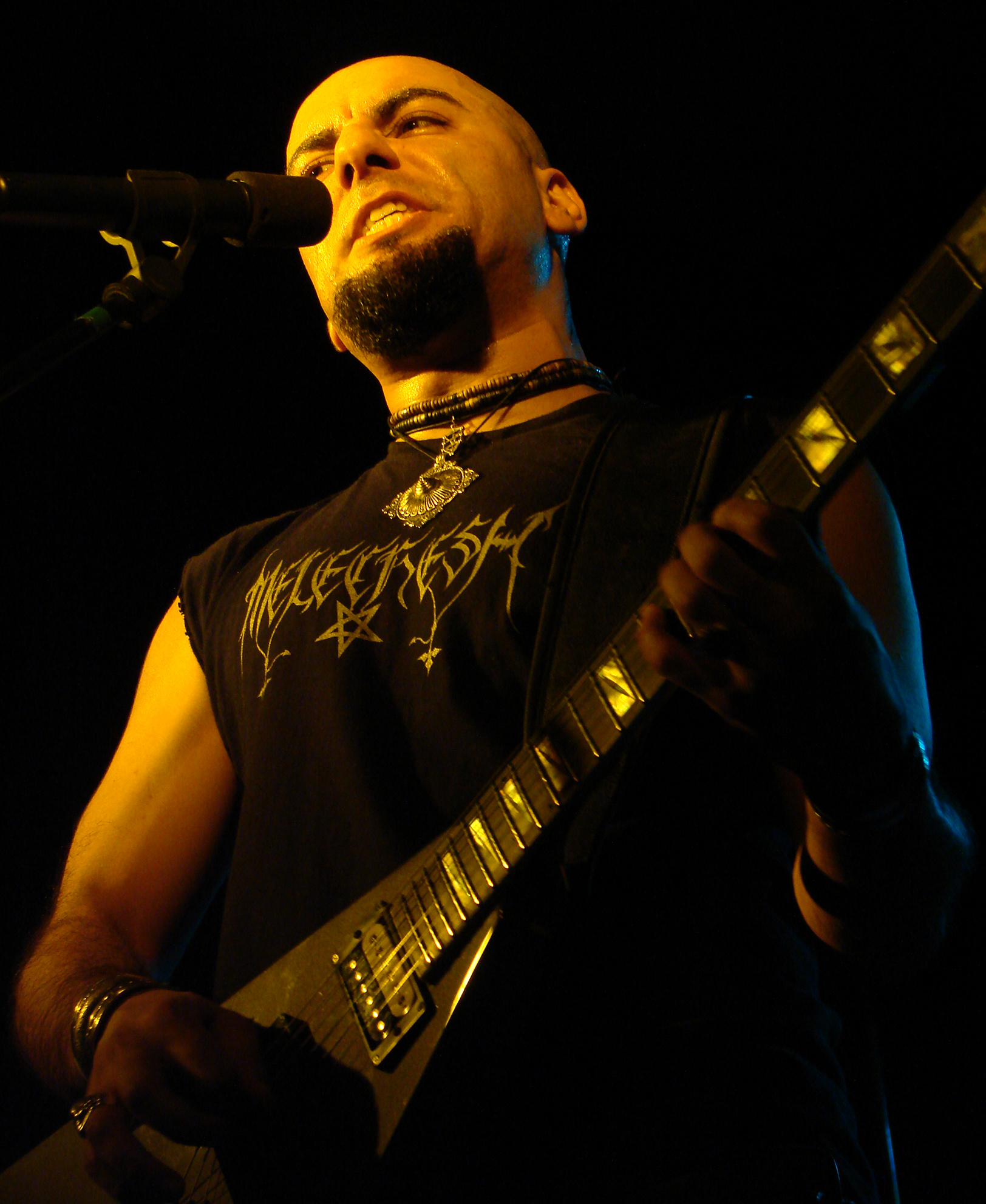
Ashmedi

The 1995 official release of demo As Jerusalem Burns... and 7-inch EP The Siege of Lachish attracted the attention of underground metal fans and local authorities. Local authorities accused Melechesh of "Dark Cult activities".

In 1996, the band released their debut album, As Jerusalem Burns...Al'Intisar, on Pulverizer Records. Bassist Al'Hazred completed the line-up. They were the first internationally signed metal band from Jerusalem and Bethlehem.

In 1998, after promo CD Mesopotamian Metal and a farewell show, Melechesh relocated to France and the Netherlands. Lord Curse remained in Jerusalem and later moved to the US to study art. The band recruited new drummer Absu of Proscriptor. Melechesh released Djinn (2001), dealing with Mesopotamian mythology, and Sphynx (2003), dealing with Mesopotamian/Sumerian mythology and Near Eastern occult themes. The band recorded fourth album Emissaries, available in Europe (Osmose Productions) and by The End Records in the United States and Canada. Drummer Xul replaced Proscriptor. A documentary about the band lost its director, but another one took over.

On 13 August 2013, Melechesh announced that Moloch left the band due to academic commitments. Xul left in July on good terms. In 2014, he was replaced with drummer Sasha Horn.

== Band members ==
=== Current members ===
- Ashmedi – lead vocals, guitars, sitar, keyboards, piano (1993–present)

=== Former members ===
- Uusur – bass (1995–1996)
- Thamuz – bass (1995)
- Cimeries – keyboards (1995)
- Al Hazred – bass, vocals (1996–2008)
- Proscriptor McGovern – drums, percussion, vocals (1999–2005)
- Xul – drums (2005–2013)
- Rahm – bass (2010–2011)
- Scorpios – bass, vocals (backing) (2013–2016)

=== Current live members ===
- Nomadic Soul – guitars (2019–present)
- Nomadic Soul – bass (2020–present)
- Simon Škrlec (BOBNAR) – drums (2015, 2016–present)

=== Session/live musicians ===
- Simon Škrlec (BOBNAR) – drums (2015, 2016–present)
- Kevin Paradis – drums (2014, 2015)
- Geert Devenster – guitars
- Kawn – bass, vocals (2007–2008)
- Malak Al'Maut – guitars (2008–2009)
- Rahm – bass (2009–2010)
- Aethyris MacKay – guitars (2011)
- Scorpios – bass, backing vocals (2012–2013)
- Max Power – guitars (2013)
- Ralph Santolla – guitars (2013)

== Discography ==
=== Studio albums ===
- As Jerusalem Burns...Al'Intisar (1996)
- Djinn (2001)
- Sphynx (2003, 2004 in North America)
- Emissaries (2006, 2007 in North America)
- The Epigenesis (2010)
- Enki (2015)

=== EPs ===
- The Siege of Lachish (1996)
- The Ziggurat Scrolls (2004)
- Mystics of the Pillar II (2012)
- The Epigenesis: Instrumentals (2022)
- Sentinels of Shamash (EP, 2026)

=== Demo ===
- As Jerusalem Burns... (1995)
