= The Sun of Tiphareth =

Studio album by Absu
- Released: March 1, 1995
- Genre: Black metal, thrash metal
- Length: 43:09
- Label: Osmose
- Producer: Absu

Absu chronology
Barathrum: V.I.T.R.I.O.L. (1993)	The Sun of Tiphareth (1995)	The Third Storm of Cythraul (1997)

Professional ratings
Review scores
Source	Rating
AllMusic	3/5 stars

The Sun of Tiphareth is the second full-length studio album by black metal band Absu. It was released on Osmose Productions in 1995.

== Track listing ==
- All music by Absu. Lyrics by Proscriptor and Equitant, with additional lyrics by Trent White. Copyright Osmose Productions.
1. "Apzu" – 11:18
2. "Feis Mor Tir Na N'Og (Across the North Sea of Visnech)" – 8:05
3. "Cyntefyn's Fountain" – 3:46
4. "A Quest Into the 77th Novel" – 5:48
5. "Our Lust for Lunar Plains (Nox Luna Inlustris)" – 1:49
6. "The Coming of War" (Trent White) – 5:15
7. "The Sun of Tiphareth" – 7:06

== Personnel ==
- Proscriptor – all percussives, synthesizers, flute and voice
- Equitant Ifernain Dal Gais – electric lead guitar and electric bass guitar
- Shaftiel (Lord of Shadows) – electric lead guitar, electric bass guitar, acoustic guitar and voice
- Lynette Mitchell – additional vocals on "Apzu", "A Quest Into the 77th Novel" and "The Coming of War"

=== Production ===
- Arranged & produced by Absu
- Executive production by Osmose Productions
- Engineered by Danny Brown at Goodnight Studios, Dallas, Texas
