= For Those Who Dare =

Studio album by Chastain
- Released: 21 July 1990
- Recorded: 1989–1990
- Studio: Leviathan, Cincinnati, Ohio; Steve Lawson Studios, Seattle, Washington; Prairie Sun Recording Studios, Cotati, California
- Genre: Heavy metal
- Length: 49:06
- Label: Leviathan / Roadrunner
- Producer: David T. Chastain

Chastain chronology
The Voice of the Cult (1988)	For Those Who Dare (1990)	Sick Society (1995)

Professional ratings
Review scores
Source	Rating
AllMusic	2/5 stars

For Those Who Dare is the fifth studio album by the American heavy metal band Chastain, released in 1990 through Leviathan Records. New members David Harbour and John Luke Hebert were part of the band that played in Leather Leone solo album Shock Waves in 1989.

== Track listing ==
All songs by David T. Chastain, except tracks 1, 4, 9, 10, lyrics by Leather Leone and "Barracuda" by Ann Wilson, Nancy Wilson, Michael DeRosier, Roger Fisher

1. "The Mountain Whispers" – 4:25
2. "For Those Who Dare" – 4:07
3. "Please Set Us Free" – 6:04
4. "I Am the Rain" – 3:34
5. "Night of Anger" – 6:23
6. "Barracuda" – 4:04 (Heart cover)
7. "Light in the Dark" – 5:23
8. "Secrets of the Damned" – 4:48
9. "Not Much Breathing" – 4:01
10. "Once Before" – 6:17

== Personnel ==
=== Band members ===
- Leather Leone – vocals
- David T. Chastain – guitars, keyboards, backing vocals, producer
- David Harbour – bass
- John Luke Hebert – drums

=== Production ===
- Dale "Smitty" Smith, Jimmy Robinson, Steve Fontano – engineers
- John Cuniberti – mixing
