= Acoustic Visions =

Studio album by David T. Chastain
- Released: 17 February 1998
- Genre: Rock, pop
- Length: 53:05
- Label: Leviathan Records
- Producer: David T. Chastain

David T. Chastain chronology
Next Planet Please (1994)	Acoustic Visions (1998)	Rock Solid Guitar (2001)

Acoustic Visions is the sixth solo album by electric guitar player David T. Chastain. This album is notable because it is the first album by David T. Chastain to be entirely recorded with acoustic guitars. Chastain also mixed, engineered, digitally edited, sequenced, and produced the album himself.

== Reception ==
Professional ratings
Review scores
Source	Rating
AllMusic	3/5 stars
Collector's Guide to Heavy Metal	6/10

AllMusic reviewer Stephen Thomas Erlewine calls David T. Chastain "a little weak", saying that "he rarely writes a memorable theme -- but as a player he's exceptional, taking these compositions further than anyone would have expected. He may no longer have the audience he had in the '80s, and he may no longer be turning out the kind of heavy metal that filled stadiums in the '80s, but Acoustic Visions indicates that David T. Chastain is now playing better and with more subtlety than he ever has."

== Track listing ==
All songs written by David T. Chastain except where noted

1. "Set" - 4:04
2. "Pyramid of the Sun" - 3:58
3. "Appassionata Minore" - 4:19
4. "Cadenza in a Harmonic Minor" - 3:49
5. "Inner Journeys" - 4:10
6. "Dirge for Yesterday" - 4:01
7. "Evening with Juilliard" - 5:21
8. "Lifetime" - 4:02
9. "Time and Time Again" - 4:32
10. "STC" - 3:55
11. "Escape from Thera" - 6:27
12. "Untitled Track" (E. Smith) - 4:27 performed by Fortaleza

== Personnel ==
- David T. Chastain - acoustic 6 and 12 string guitars, producer, engineer, mixing
- Steven Taylor - art direction, graphic design
