= In Dementia =

Studio album by Chastain
- Released: January 1, 1997
- Recorded: 1996
- Studio: Davenhill Studios and Leviathan Studios, Atlanta, Georgia, Twelvetone Studios, Sacramento, California, The Lodge, Indianapolis, Indiana
- Genre: Heavy metal
- Length: 55:11
- Label: Leviathan
- Producer: David T. Chastain

Chastain chronology
Sick Society (1995)	In Dementia (1997)	In an Outrage (2004)

Professional ratings
Review scores
Source	Rating
AllMusic	3/5 stars
Collector's Guide to Heavy Metal	5/10

In Dementia is the seventh studio album by the American heavy metal band Chastain, released in 1997 through Leviathan Records. The album was re-issued in Europe by Massacre Records.

== Track listing ==
All songs by David T. Chastain and Kate French

1. "Human Sacrifice" – 6:09
2. "Blackening" – 4:47
3. "Seven" – 6:28
4. "Sick Puppy" – 4:48
5. "Tongue" – 6:13
6. "In Dementia" – 5:44
7. "House of Stone" – 5:43
8. "Conformity" – 6:35
9. "Desperately" – 8:44

== Personnel ==
=== Band members ===
- Kate French – lead and backing vocals, engineer
- David T. Chastain – electric and acoustic guitars, keyboards, backing vocals, producer, engineer
- Kevin Kekes – bass guitar
- Dennis Lesh – drums

=== Production ===
- Ryan Adkins, David Shew – engineers
