= The Voice of the Cult =

- Cover art by Guy Aitchison

Studio album by Chastain
- Released: 1988
- Studio: Counterpoint Creative, Cincinnati, Ohio; Steve Lawson Studios, Seattle, Washington
- Genre: Heavy metal
- Length: 37:35
- Label: Leviathan
- Producer: David T. Chastain

Chastain chronology
The 7th of Never (1987)	The Voice of the Cult (1988)	For Those Who Dare (1990)

The Voice of the Cult is the fourth studio album by heavy metal band Chastain, released in 1988 through Leviathan Records.

== Critical reception ==
Professional ratings
Review scores
Source	Rating
AllMusic	2/5 stars
Collector's Guide to Heavy Metal	5/10

Andy Hinds at AllMusic gave The Voice of the Cult two stars out of five, calling it "mainly a rehash of the band's Ruler of the Wasteland album, which had better songs" while saying that it would appeal to fans of David Chastain's guitar work and Leather Leone's singing. Canadian journalist Martin Popoff notices the better production in comparison with Chastain's previous efforts, but concludes that the album is "as usual, useful as a guitar showcase, laughable as a band recording."

== Track listing ==
All tracks are written by David T. Chastain, except where noted.

Side one
No.	Title	Length
1.	"The Voice of the Cult"	4:33
2.	"Live Hard"	3:08
3.	"Chains of Love"	3:30
4.	"Share Yourself with Me" (lyrics: Leather Leone)	3:51
5.	"Fortune Teller"	4:24

Side two
No.	Title	Length
6.	"Child of Evermore"	4:25
7.	"Soldiers of the Flame" (lyrics: Leone)	3:10
8.	"Evil for Evil"	4:14
9.	"Take Me Home"	6:20
Total length:		37:35

== Personnel ==
=== Band members ===
- Leather Leone – lead vocals, background vocals
- David T. Chastain – guitar, production
- Mike Skimmerhorn – bass, background vocals
- Ken Mary – drums

=== Production ===
- Dale Smith – guitar, bass and vocals recording engineer
- Terry Date – drums recording engineer, mixing
- George Horn – mastering at Fantasy Studios, Berkeley, California
