= Reggies =

Restaurant

- Interactive map of Reggies
- Address: 2109 South State Street
- Coordinates: 41°51′14.1″N 87°37′36.3″W
- Owner: Robby Glick
- Capacity: 400/110

Construction
- Opened: September 8th, 2007

Website
- http://www.reggieslive.com/

Reggies is a restaurant and music venue in Chicago, Illinois, United States.

== Description ==
Reggies contains three venues for concerts and functions:

- Reggies Music Joint with a standing capacity of 110
- Reggies Rock Club with a standing capacity of 400
- Bananna's Comedy Shack for stand-up comedy, small-band shows, and private parties.

== History ==
Reggies opened on September 8, 2007. Since then, it has held many concerts for both local, national, and international musicians and bands.
