= Absu (album) =

Studio album by Absu
- Released: Europe: February 16, 2009; North America: February 24, 2009
- Genre: Thrash metal, black metal
- Label: Candlelight
- Producer: Absu

Absu chronology
Mythological Occult Metal: 1991–2001 (2005)	Absu (2009)	Abzu (2011)

Professional ratings
Review scores
Source	Rating
Allmusic	3/5 stars
Metal Temple	7/10 stars
Metal.de	10/10 stars
MetalCentre.com	10/10
Pitchfork Media	8.2/10
Sputnikmusic	3.5/5 stars

Absu is the fifth studio album by metal band Absu. It was released on February 16, 2009 (Europe), and February 24, 2009 (USA), by Candlelight Records. It is the debut recording for new members Aethyris MacKay and Zawicizuz, with additional musical contributions from Vastator Terrarum (who left before completing the album) and original guitarist Shaftiel. Ezezu joined the band after the recording process was completed. In October 2009, Candlelight Records announced the album would be re-released and repackaged on January 26, 2010, with a DVD of a live performance in Montreal, Quebec, Canada on June 19, 2009.

== Track listing ==
No.	Title	Writer(s)	Length
1.	"Between the Absu of Eridu and Erech"	Aethyris, Proscriptor	4:08
2.	"Night Fire Canonization"	Proscriptor, Shaftiel	3:19
3.	"Amy"	Proscriptor, Zawicizuz	4:54
4.	"Nunbarshegunu"	Aethyris, Ashmedi, Vastator	3:05
5.	"13 Globes"	Aethyris, Proscriptor	4:46
6.	"...Of the Dead Who Never Rest in Their Tombs Are the Attendance of Familiar Spirits...: A. Diversified Signs Inscribed; B. Our Earth of Black; C. Voor"	Proscriptor, Zawicizuz	7:03
7.	"Magic(k) Square Cipher"	Aethyris, Proscriptor	4:48
8.	"In the Name of Auebothiabathabaithobeuee"	Proscriptor, Vastator	3:25
9.	"Girra's Temple"	Proscriptor, Shaftiel	2:38
10.	"Those of the Void Will Re-Enter"	Aethyris, Ashmedi, Vastator	4:56
11.	"Sceptre Command"	Aethyris, Proscriptor	5:00
12.	"Ye Uttuku Spells"	Aethyris, Ashmedi, Vastator	4:41
13.	"Twix Yesterday, the Day and the Morrow"	Equitant	0:57

Special edition DVD
No.	Title	Length
1.	"An Involution of Thorns (Intro) / Descent to Acheron"
2.	"Apzu"
3.	"Night Fire Canonization"
4.	"The Thrice Is the Greatest to Ninnigal"
5.	"13 Globes"
6.	"Amy"
7.	"Nunbarshegunu"
8.	"Voor [Instrumental] / Swords and Leather"
9.	"Four Crossed Wands (Spell 181) / Vorago (Spell 182)"
10.	"Manannan""
11.	"Twix Yesterday, the Day & the Morrow (Instrumental) / Girra's Temple"
12.	"Highland Tyrant Attack"
13.	"Encore: The Coming of War"
14.	"Encore Deux: Magic(k) Square Cipher"

== Line-up ==
- Proscriptor McGovern – vocals, drums and percussion, mellotron and lyrics
- Aethyris MacKay – electric lead, rhythm, acoustic and bass guitars, mellotron
- Zawicizuz – electric lead, rhythm and bass guitars, synthesizers, programming

=== Guests ===
- Ashmedi (Melechesh) – lyrics for "Nunbarshegunu", "Those of the Void Will Re-Enter" and "Ye Uttuku Spells"
- Blasphemer (ex-Mayhem/Ava Inferi) – guitar solos on "Night Fire Canonization" and "Girra's Temple"
- Equitant (ex-Absu/Equitant) – programming, synth and arrangements on "Twix Yesterday, the Day & the Morrow"
- David Harbour (ex–King Diamond/David Harbour) – synthesizer solo on "B) Our Earth of Black" (part II of "...Of the Dead Who Never Rest in Their Tombs Are the Attendance of Familiar Spirits...")
- Michael Harris (Darkology/Michael Harris) – guitar solo on "In the Name of Auebothiabathabaithobeuee" and "Those of the Void Will Re-Enter"
- Mindwalker (The Firstborn) – backing vocals and ceremonial Tibetan horn on "13 Globes"
- Nornagest (Enthroned) – backing vocals on "Night Fire Canonization" and "Amy"
- Vorskaath (Zemial) – backing vocals, brake disc, gates, Greek bell and vibraslap on "Amy" and "A) Diversified Signs Inscribed" (part I of "...Of the Dead Who Never Rest in Their Tombs Are the Attendance of Familiar Spirits...")

=== Production ===
- Produced & engineered by Absu
- Executive production: Candlelight Records
- Pre-production by Zawicizuz
- Drum engineering by Gary Long & Sterling Winfield
- Mixed by J.T. Longoria
- Mastered & edited by Proscriptor

=== Live DVD ===
- Proscriptor McGovern – vocals, drums
- Ezezu – vocals, bass
- Aethyris MacKay – guitars
- Zawicizuz – guitars, backing vocals
