= Ruler of the Wasteland =

- Cover art by Guy Aitchison

Studio album by Chastain
- Released: June 1986
- Recorded: 1986
- Studio: Prairie Sun Recording Studios, Cotati, California
- Genre: Heavy metal
- Length: 37:11
- Label: Shrapnel
- Producer: Steve Fontano, David T. Chastain, Mike Varney

Chastain chronology
| Mystery of Illusion (1985) | Ruler of the Wasteland (1986) | The 7th of Never (1987) |

Professional ratings
Review scores
| Source | Rating |
|---|---|
| AllMusic | 2.5/5 stars |
| Collector's Guide to Heavy Metal | 7/10 |

Ruler of the Wasteland is the second studio album by the American heavy metal band Chastain, released in 1986 through Shrapnel Records. During the same year, David T. Chastain released also two other studio albums with his second band CJSS. It is the first album to feature Fifth Angel drummer Ken Mary, who replaced Fred Coury, after a suggestion by Shrapnel Records president and talent scout Mike Varney.

== Track listing ==
All songs by David T. Chastain

Side one

1. "Ruler of the Wasteland" – 3:46
2. "One Day to Live" – 4:06
3. "The King Has the Power" – 3:03
4. "Fighting to Stay Alive" – 3:54
5. "Angel of Mercy" – 5:14

Side two

6. "There Will Be Justice" – 4:13
7. "The Battle of Nevermore" – 5:08
8. "Living in a Dreamworld" – 3:26
9. "Children of Eden" – 4:21

=== 2008 remastered CD edition bonus tracks ===
10. "The Battle of Nevermore" (demo) – 5:48
11. "Children of Eden" (demo) – 4:55

== Personnel ==
=== Band members ===
- Leather Leone – vocals
- David T. Chastain – guitars, producer
- Mike Skimmerhorn – bass
- Ken Mary – drums

=== Production ===
- Steve Fontano – producer, engineer, mixing
- Stuart Hirotsu – overdubs engineer
- Mike Varney – executive producer

== Covers ==
The Swedish power metal band HammerFall covered the song "Angel of Mercy" on the studio album Crimson Thunder and then on the compilation album of covers Masterpieces

The German band Powergod covered the song "Ruler of the Wasteland" in their album of covers Bleed for the Gods: That's Metal - Lesson I
