= House of God (album) =

Studio album by King Diamond
- Released: 20 June 2000
- Recorded: February–April 2000
- Studio: Nomad Recording Studio, Carrollton, Texas
- Genre: Heavy metal
- Length: 51:18
- Label: Massacre (EU) / Metal Blade (US)
- Producer: King Diamond; Andy LaRocque; Kol Marshall

King Diamond chronology
Voodoo (1998)	House of God (2000)	Nightmare in the Nineties (2001)

Professional ratings
Review scores
Source	Rating
Allmusic	2/5 stars
Fangoria	2.5/4 stars

House of God is the ninth studio album by Danish heavy metal band King Diamond, released on 20 June 2000. It is the only album to feature guitarist Glen Drover and bassist Paul David Harbour, and the last to feature drummer John Luke Hébert.

House of God was remastered by Andy LaRocque and re-released in 2009.

== Plot ==
The album's storyline is loosely based on the legend of Rennes-le-Château.

It begins with a dirge-like monologue:

"Upon the Cross he did not die, they tortured him, but he survived. Smuggled across the open sea, to Southern France, tranquility. There he married Magdalene, and founded another dynasty. A church was built upon a hill, to serve all of the gods at will." ("Upon the Cross")

One night centuries later, a weary traveler becomes lost in the woods, in an area ominously called "The Devil's Hide", despite being familiar with the place. Unfortunately, he and his horse are soon surrounded by hungry wolves, watching from the forest ("The Trees Have Eyes"). Suddenly, a she-wolf with shining blue eyes appears, making all other wolves back away. Instinctively trusting this wolf, the traveler follows her to a small church at the bottom of a hill. Upon seeing it for the first time, the traveler notices a dark inscription on the door: "THIS PLACE IS TERRIBLE." ("Follow the Wolf")

The traveler enters the church, the titular House of God, in which everything starts to change from decrepitude to great opulence, full of food and drink. The wolf transforms into a beautiful woman and introduces herself as "Angel", promising to love the traveler forever. The traveler falls in love with Angel at first sight, and the two make love to each other frequently in the church ("House of God"). However, within days the traveler begins noticing small, odd behaviors from Angel, including her kissing a small, black statue of a sinister devil "sitting by the altar". He also mentions seeing two distinct pulpits, both depicting demonic images ("Black Devil").

Time passes. One day, while he is with Angel in the confession booth, she breaks down in tears and tells him her dramatic fate: a year prior to meeting the traveler, Angel was contracted by supernatural forces to guard the church; she reverts into her wolf form any time she leaves the grounds of the church and can only take human form within the building. Worse, Angel has one year to find a replacement for herself as guardian of the House of God. If she is successful, Angel will be freed from her contract and be permitted to leave the church as a normal woman once again, but with no memory of her time there. However, if she cannot find someone to take her place, she will die at the year's end, which will happen within one week. In sorrow, out of love for her, the traveler signs the pact in order to save Angel's life, allowing her to be free even though she won't remember him ("The Pact", "Goodbye").

After her departure, the traveler nearly loses his mind out of heartache and isolation. The monotony of each day and the knowledge of being trapped for eternity unhinges him, and in his desperation he starts to destroy any mirror he can find around the church ("Just a Shadow", "Help!"). The traveler then witnesses the opening of a hidden trapdoor beneath the altar leading to the catacombs. Compelled by forces he cannot explain, the traveler descends ("Passage to Hell"). Following a mysterious light to a subterranean chamber, he encounters a crumbling statue of the Virgin Mary and breaks it open. Inside he discovers the mummified remains of a crucified, glowing corpse bearing "a crown of thorns". Hearing an unearthly roar, in horror, the traveler realizes that this is the body of Jesus Christ and flees back up into the church ("Catacomb").

Upon his re-emergence, the traveler is followed by what he describes as a myriad of winds and lights; "contorted faces and bodies". Claiming to be unconcerned with living or dying anymore, the traveler questions these entities, who inform him that he has learned "the lie, the lie about the Cross". While they tauntingly will not reveal why they are keeping the corpse of Jesus, the Entities state that they are the forces behind the ideals of God and Satan. The Entities survive on the beliefs inspired by the eternal battle between Good and Evil, though the Entities themselves are far higher beings beyond these concepts. They advise the traveler to simply "live [his] life the best [he] can, and leave the rest to [the Entities]", but after these revelations he loses his faith completely and denounces God. Now knowing what he perceives to be the truth of the world, the traveler cannot accept what he has learned and hangs himself in desperation and pain. As he leaps, he yells out, "THIS PLACE IS TERRIBLE", the inscription on the door of the House of God ("This Place is Terrible").

== Track listing ==
No.	Title	Writer(s)	Length
1.	"Upon the Cross"	King Diamond	1:44
2.	"The Trees Have Eyes"	King Diamond, Andy LaRocque	4:46
3.	"Follow the Wolf"	King Diamond	4:27
4.	"House of God"	King Diamond, Andy LaRocque	5:36
5.	"Black Devil"	King Diamond	4:28
6.	"The Pact"	King Diamond, Andy LaRocque	4:10
7.	"Goodbye"	King Diamond	1:59
8.	"Just a Shadow"	King Diamond	4:36
9.	"Help!!!"	King Diamond	4:21
10.	"Passage to Hell"	King Diamond	1:59
11.	"Catacomb"	King Diamond, Andy LaRocque	5:01
12.	"This Place Is Terrible"	King Diamond	5:34
13.	"Peace of Mind" (Instrumental)	Andy LaRocque	2:31

== Personnel ==
- King Diamond - vocals
- Andy LaRocque - guitars
- Glen Drover - guitars
- David Harbour - bass
- John Luke Hébert - drums
