= Chastain (band) =

American heavy metal band

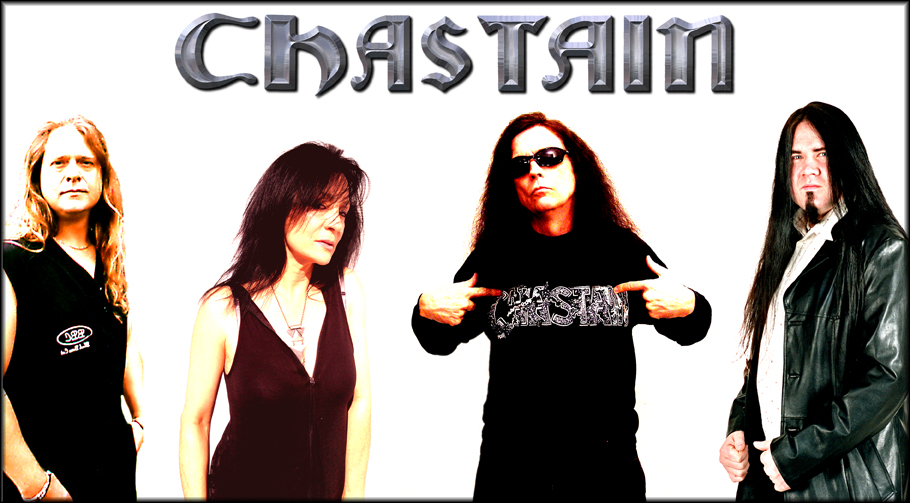

Background information
- Origin: Cincinnati, Ohio, U.S.
- Genres: Heavy metal, power metal
- Years active: 1984–present
- Labels: Shrapnel, Leviathan
- Members: Leather Leone; David T. Chastain; Stian Kristoffersen; Mike Skimmerhorn
- Past members: Kate French; David Harbour; Kevin Kekes; Fred Coury; Ken Mary; John Luke Hebert; Dennis Lesh; Stygian; Pat O'Brien; Dave Starr; Larry Howe

Chastain is an American heavy metal music band formed in 1984 by guitarist David T. Chastain and signed to Shrapnel Records.

== Career ==
The band was formed in 1984 by Mike Varney, president of Shrapnel, for a David T. Chastain solo album. Varney noticed Chastain's shreddingwhile the latter played with Cincinnati-based band CJSS. He wanted to create a vehicle for singer Leather Leone, formerly of San Francisco band Rude Girl. The first band lineup included Leone, Chastain, CJSS bassist Mike Skimmerhorn, and drummer Fred Coury, who later played in Cinderella. In 1986, Chastain declared, "I could never work with these people on a full-time basis because they live all over the country (...). We just get together once a year, record an album and then go off and do our own things". Chastain wrote music for CJSS and his solo albums, produced other artists, and managed his record label.

Their debut album, Mystery of Illusion, was released worldwide in 1985, followed by Ruler of the Wasteland (1986), both through Shrapnel, and The 7th of Never (1987) through Chastain's label, Leviathan Records. Drummer Ken Mary (Fifth Angel, TKO, Flotsam and Jetsam (band)) replaced Coury from 1986 to 1988. The fourth album, The Voice of the Cult, was released in 1988. On 1990's For Those Who Dare, bass player David Harbour replaced Skimmerhorn and drummer John Luke Hebert replaced Mary, who joined Alice Cooper. Having put CJSS on hiatus to focus on Chastain, the band became Chastain's main touring occupation, with a succession of world tours until 1991.

After some years of quiescence, when David T. Chastain dedicated his time to other solo projects, in 1995 appeared Sick Society and in 1997 In Dementia, which were recorded with a new cast: Kate French on vocals, Kevin Kekes on bass and former Trouble member Dennis Lesh on drums.

Until the appearance of the 2004 album In an Outrage, the band disappeared again. The lineup for this album consisted of David Chastain, singer Kate French, Larry Howe, and Dave Starr (both ex-Vicious Rumors).

Chastain reformed with original vocalist Leather Leone, Mike Skimmerhorn and drummer Stian Kristoffersen (Pagan's Mind) to release "Surrender to No One" in 2013 and "We Bleed Metal" in 2015. Leather continues to tour under her own name performing classic and new Chastain tracks.

== Lineup ==
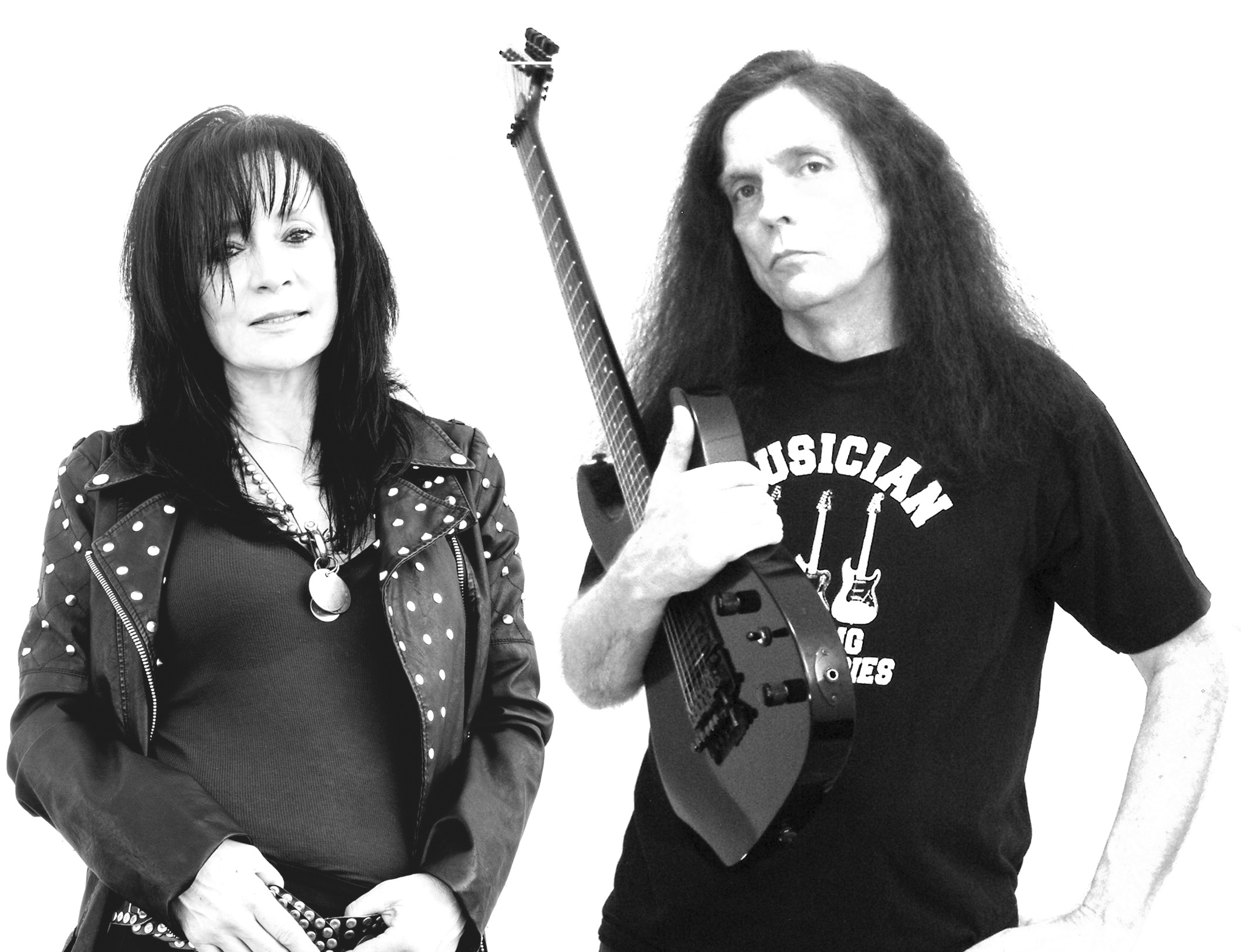
Leather Leone and David Chastain

=== Current members ===
- Leather Leone – vocals (1984–1992, 2013–present)
- David T. Chastain – guitar, keyboards (1984–present)
- Mike Skimmerhorn – bass (1984–1989, 2013–present)
- Stian Kristoffersen – drums (2013–present)

=== Past members ===
- Kate French – vocals (1995–2005), bass (1995–1997)
- David Harbour – bass (1989–1992)
- Kevin Kekes – bass (1997–1998)
- Dave Starr – bass (2001–2005)
- Fred Coury – drums (1984–1986)
- Ken Mary – drums (1986–1990)
- John Luke Hebert – drums (1990–1992)
- Dennis Lesh – drums (1995–1998)
- Larry Howe – drums (2001–2005)

== Discography ==
=== Studio albums ===
- Mystery of Illusion (1985)
- Ruler of the Wasteland (1986)
- The 7th of Never (1987)
- The Voice of the Cult (1988)
- For Those Who Dare (1990)
- Sick Society (1995)
- In Dementia (1997)
- In an Outrage (2004)
- Surrender to No One (2013)
- We Bleed Metal (2015)

=== Re-Arranged Albums ===
- Wicked Riffs 8790 (2012)
- Surrender to No One Uncut (2013)
- We Bleed Metal 17 (2017)
- 1321 (2021)

=== Compilations ===
- The Reign of Leather (2010)
- Metal in Your Face (2012)
- Chastainium (2017)
- The Reign of Kate (2019)
- Chastainium v2 (2022)
- The Reign of Leather II (2023)

== See also ==
- Shock Waves (1989) Leather Leone album
