= April Samuels =

American drummer

- Also known as: Crash Gordon
- Born: April 30, 1969 (age 55); Amarillo, TX United States
- Origin: Dallas, TX United States
- Genres: Rock
- Occupation(s): Drummer, songwriter, speaker, author, philanthropist
- Instrument(s): Drums, backing vocals
- Labels: 100 Proof Entertainment, Perfect World Entertainment
- Website: www.aprilsamuels.com / www.breastcancercanstickit.org

April Samuels (born April 30, 1969) is an American rock drummer, breast cancer survivor, and founder of Breast Cancer Can Stick It! Foundation, Inc. - a 501(c)(3) nonprofit. She is based out of Dallas, Texas. She is best known for her nonprofit and for playing drums as Crash Gordon in the 1980s hair metal cover band, Metal Shop Dallas. She is also known for co-writing songs for Discovery Channel's Outward Bound with her bandmates in Frognot.

Samuels is endorsed by Aquarian Drumheads, Drumtacs, Humes & Berg Drum Cases, Los Cabos Drumsticks, Rockett Drum Works (founded by Rikki Rockett), Rock-n-Roller Multi-cart SABIAN Cymbals, and Wornstar Clothing.
