= Abzu (album) =

Studio album by Absu
- Released: October 11, 2011
- Recorded: March to May 2011
- Genre: Black metal, thrash metal
- Length: 35:59
- Label: Candlelight
- Producer: Absu

Absu chronology
Absu (2009)	Abzu (2011)

Abzu is the sixth and final studio album by American metal band Absu. It was released in 2011 on Candlelight Records. It features new members in the form of guitarist Vis Crom and bassist/vocalist Ezezu; although Ezezu did join the band after the recording of Absu, this is his first studio recording with Absu.

== Track list ==
All lyrics are written by Proscriptor

No.	Title	Music	Length
1.	"Earth Ripper"	Vis Crom	3:48
2.	"Circles of the Oath"	Ezezu	5:12
3.	"Abraxas Connexus"	Vis Crom	3:53
4.	"Skrying in the Spirit Vision"	Ezezu	3:52
5.	"Ontologically, It Became Time & Space"	Ezezu, Vis Crom	4:48
6.	"A Song for Ea": I. E-A; II. A Myriad of Portals; III. 3rd Tablet; IV. Warren of Imhullu; V. The Waters– The Denizens; VI. E-A" (Reprise)"	Ezezu, Vis Crom, Proscriptor	14:26

== Personnel ==
=== Absu ===
- Ezezu – bass, mellotron, vocals
- Vis Crom – electric & acoustic guitars
- Proscriptor McGovern – drums, percussion, mellotron, vocals

=== Additional personnel ===
- Rune "Blasphemer" Ericksen (formerly of the Norwegian black metal band Mayhem; now with Ava Inferi) – all lead guitars

=== Production ===
- Executive production: Candlelight Records
- Produced & engineered by Absu
- Mixed by J.T. Longoria
- Mastered & edited by Proscriptor
