= Rock Solid Guitar =

Studio album by David T. Chastain
- Released: 1 January 2001
- Genre: Heavy metal
- Length: 43:46
- Label: Leviathan Records
- Producer: David T. Chastain

David T. Chastain chronology
Acoustic Visions (1998)	Rock Solid Guitar (2001)	Countdown to Infinity (2007)

Professional ratings
Review scores
Source	Rating
Allmusic	3.5/5 stars

Rock Solid Guitar is the seventh studio album by guitarist David T. Chastain. The last song on the album, "Hats Off to Angus and Malcolm", is Chastain's tribute to the AC/DC brothers, Angus and Malcolm Young.

== Track listing ==
All songs by David T. Chastain, except where noted

1. "Burning Passions" - 4:39
2. "Sounds Cool to Me" - 5:28
3. "Dancing with the Devil's Mistress" - 4:49
4. "Never Too Much" (Chastain, Luther Vandross) - 4:50
5. "Getting a Little Crazy" - 3:52
6. "In Memoriam" - 4:34
7. "Riding In Style" - 4:07
8. "Keeper of Tomorrow" - 4:29
9. "Hats Off to Angus and Malcolm" - 6:58

== Musicians ==
- David T. Chastain - Electric Guitar
- Mike Haid - Drums
- Don Mitchell - Photography
- Steven Taylor - Bass, Graphic Design
