= Enthroned =

Belgian black metal band

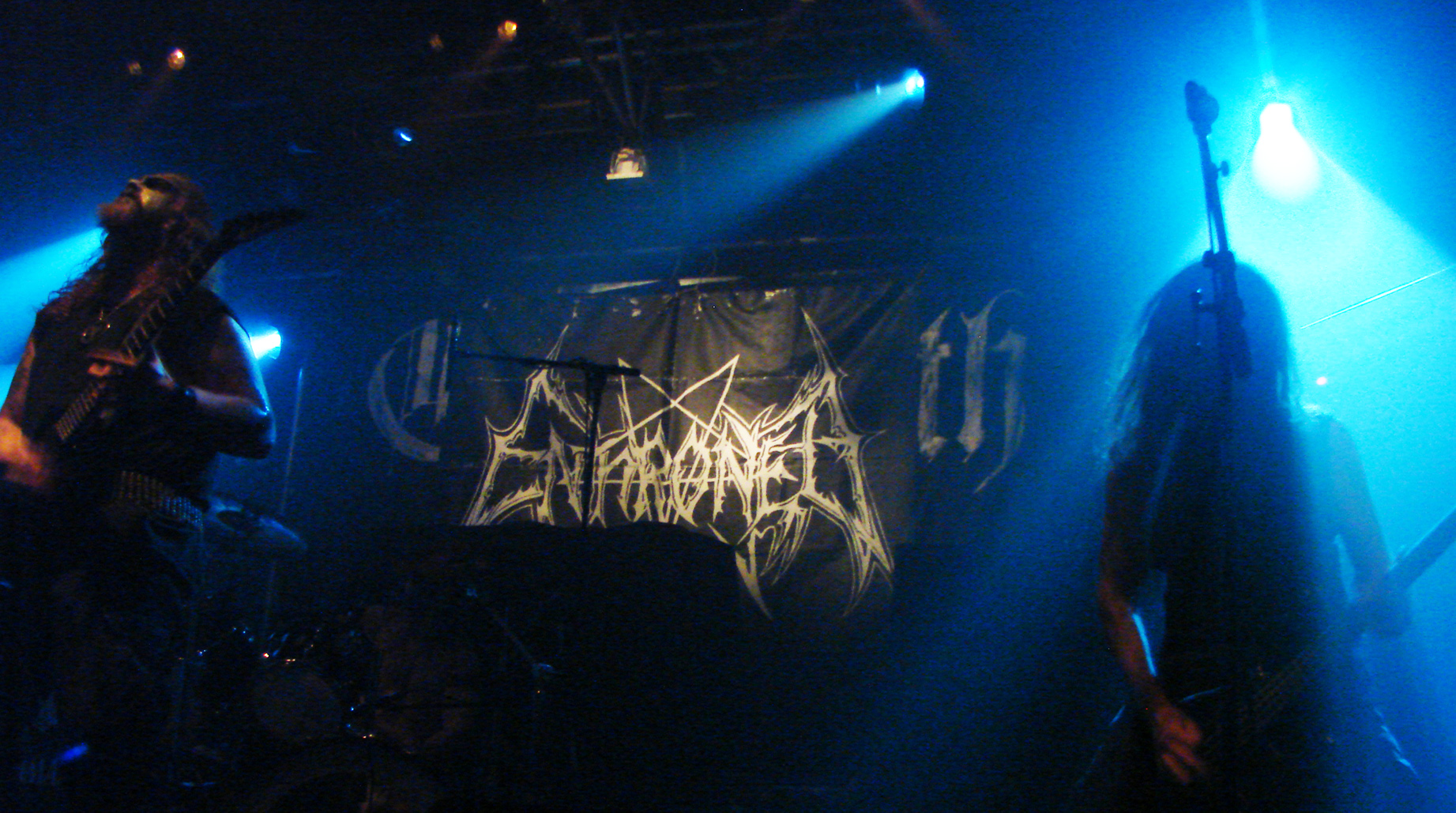
- Enthroned performing in a concert in Paris, November 20, 2007

Background information
- Origin: Brussels, Belgium
- Genre: Black metal
- Years active: 1993–present
- Labels: Season of Mist, Agonia, Blackend, Napalm, Regain Records
- Members: Nornagest; Menthor; T. Kaos
- Past members: Garghuf; Nguaroth; Ahephaim; Alsvid; Lord Sabathan; Glaurung; Namroth Blackthorn; Nebiros; Cernunnos; Tsebaoth; Phorgath; Shagãl; ZarZax; Neraath; Norgaath; Wrast

Enthroned is a Belgian black metal band formed in Charleroi. They are a premier Belgian black metal scene act.

== History ==
The band was founded in 1993 by drummer Cernunnos. He recruited guitarist Tsebaoth and a vocalist from grindcore/black metal band Hecate, who stayed until December 1993. Bassist/vocalist Sabathan joined. The band released a five-track demo tape in mid-1994, which brought attention from independent labels. A 7-inch split EP with Ancient Rites was released by Afterdark Records. After the label's demise, Evil Omen Records (a sub-label of Osmose Productions) released Enthroned's first full-length album, Prophecies of Pagan Fire. Shortly after, the band enlisted second guitarist Nornagest. Tseboath was replaced with Nebiros.

In 1996, along with Ancient Rites and Bewitched, Enthroned began an extensive tour of Europe.

In April 1997, as Enthroned was about to record Towards the Skullthrone of Satan, Cernunnos committed suicide by hanging himself. He was 25 years old. Enthroned recorded the album with a session drummer in honor of Cernunnos, and performed at the Dragons Blaze festival with new drummer Namroth Blackthorn.

In April 1998, the band toured Europe with Dark Funeral, and released the mini CD Regie Sathanas: A Tribute to Cernunnos, dedicated to their former drummer. Later that year, they toured with Hecate Enthroned and Usurper. At the close of 1998, the band entered Abyss Studios (Sweden) to record The Apocalypse Manifesto. The band's third album was released in May 1999, and interpreted the Apocalypse through a Norse mythological perspective.

Enthroned toured with Marduk and continued to tour Europe in 1999.

In 2000, the band parted ways with Nebiros and recruited guitarist Nerath Daemon. They went on a German mini tour followed by several other European shows, and recorded Armoured Bestial Hell at Real Sound Studio (Germany). This fourth album was released in April 2001. Namroth Blackthorn was replaced with Alsvid from French black metal band Seth. Enthroned continued to play live shows in and around Europe, as well as in the US.

In early 2002, Enthroned signed to Napalm Records and released their fifth full-length recording, Carnage in Worlds Beyond, later that year. In June 2003, Nguaroth (guitars) and Glaurung (drums) joined Enthroned, and they played a South American tour and released their sixth album, XES Haereticum.

In 2005, Enthroned released their first official live album, Black Goat Ritual, recorded during their tour of Brazil. Enthroned parted ways with Sabathan. Nornagest took over vocals and bassist Phorgath joined the band.

In June 2007, Enthroned recorded their seventh album, Tetra Karcist. Drummer Alsvid returned for the studio sessions.

Drummer Ahephahim joined in June 2007, and Enthroned signed with Regain Records in January 2008. At this time, some band members opened recording studio Blackout Multimedia. Ahephaim and Nguaroth left the band due to lack of time and were replaced with ex-Gorgoroth drummer Garghuf. Nerath Daemon reverted to the position he left five years prior and changed his stage name to Neraath. Enthroned's eight album, Pentagrammaton, was released on 22 March 2010. Since then, Nornagest has given up playing guitar in live performances, due to chronic tendonitis in his wrist, and has become the band's frontman. Former members Lord Sabathan and Nguaroth joined the band for a one-off live performance in 2010 as an act of reconciliation.

In September 2011, Enthroned announced that their collaboration with Regain Records had ended while the band was busy recording their ninth studio album which was titled Obsidium and was released on 10 March 2012 through Agonia Records.

On 15 April 2014 Enthroned released their tenth studio album; Sovereigns.

In 2016, long time bassist Phorgath and guitarist ZarZax departed the band on amicable terms, and were replaced by Norgaath and Shagãl respectively for live shows and officially joined the band in 2018.

In 2017, Enthroned ended their contract with Agonia Records. According to Nornagest the band's eleventh studio album has been on the works since 2017. In December 2018 the band announced on their Facebook page alongside their 25th anniversary post that their next album will be released on 2019. In January 2019 Enthroned announced that they have signed with Season of Mist to release their new album as well as future projects. They will also embark on a world tour to support the album. On 20 March 2019 Cold Black Suns was revealed as the title of their eleventh album which was released on 7 June. On 15 April the band released a music video for the song "Hosanna Satana". On 1 October 2019 the band announced that guitarist ZarZax had rejoined the band since Shagãl decided to leave Enthroned in order to focus on his band, Vibrion.

== Band Members ==
=== Current Lineup ===
- Nornagest – guitars (1995–2012), lead vocals (2007–present)
- Menthor – drums (2012–present)
- T. Kaos – guitars, bass (2025-present)

=== Former members ===
- Tsebaoth – guitar (1993–1995)
- Cernunnos – drums (1993–1997; died 1997)
- Lord Sabathan – lead vocals, bass (1993–2006)
- Nebiros – guitar (1995–2000)
- Namroth Blackthorn – drums (1997–2001)
- Neraath – guitars (2000–2004, 2009–2024)
- Alsvid – drums (2001–2004, session 2007)
- Glaurung – drums (2004–2006)
- Nguaroth – guitars (2004–2009)
- Phorgath – bass (2007–2017)
- Ahephaim – drums (2007–2009)
- Garghuf – drums (2009–2012)
- ZarZax – guitar (2012–2015, 2019–2022)
- Shagãl – guitars (2015–2019)
- Norgaath – bass (2017–2024)
- Wrast – guitars (2022–2024)

== Discography ==
=== Studio albums ===
- Prophecies of Pagan Fire (1995, Evil Omen Productions) - Re-released with a bonus CD entitled Commanders of Chaos in 1999 by Blackend Records
- Towards the Skullthrone of Satan (1997, Blackend Records)
- The Apocalypse Manifesto (1999, Blackend Records)
- Armoured Bestial Hell (2001, Blackend Records)
- Carnage in Worlds Beyond (2002, Napalm Records)
- XES Haereticum (2004, Napalm Records)
- Tetra Karcist (2007, Napalm Records)
- Pentagrammaton (2010, Regain Records)
- Obsidium (2012, Agonia Records)
- Sovereigns (2014, Agonia Records)
- Cold Black Suns (2019, Season of Mist)
- Ashpawn (2025, Season of Mist)

=== EPs ===
- Regie Sathanas: A Tribute to Cernunnos (EP, 1998, Blackend Records)
- Goatlust (EP, 2003, Painkiller Records)

=== Other ===
- Black Goat Ritual: Live in Thy Flesh (Live album, 2005, Napalm Records)
- Hadean - The Early Years Collection (Box-set, 2023, Dissonance Productions)
