= Assyrians in Palestine =

Ethnic group in Palestine

- (Assyrian homeland) (Palestine)

Total population
- Unknown

Regions with significant populations
- Jerusalem, Bethlehem

Languages
- Levantine Arabic, Neo-Aramaic

Religion
- Syriac Orthodox Church, Syriac Catholic Church, Chaldean Catholic Church

Related ethnic groups
- Assyrians

Assyrians in Palestine (Arabic: آشُورِيُّون في دولة فلسطين) or Assyrian Palestinians are Assyrians living in Palestine, whose number is several thousands.

== History ==
The Assyrian presence in modern Palestine mainly originated from those who fled the Assyrian genocide from Tur Abdin in 1915. Many found refuge in what was known as the "Syriac Quarter" in Bethlehem and the since destroyed "Syriac Quarter" in the Old City of Jerusalem, squeezed between the Armenian Quarter and the Jewish Quarter at the Old City's southern end.

After the Israel-Arab War of 1967, hundreds of Syriacs who had fled the Old City of Jerusalem during war returned to find their homes taken over by Israeli authorities and were scheduled to be handed over to Jewish settlers or else demolished to make way for housing built for Jews. It is estimated that 65% of Syriacs who inhabited the Holy Land at the beginning of 1967 left the region (mostly Jerusalem and Bethlehem) in the following years.

The Assyrians in the Holy Land today number about 5,000, mostly living in the cities of Jerusalem and Bethlehem, including a small remnant of the Syriac Quarter of the Old City that contains the Syriac social club and St. Mark's Monastery.

== Religion ==
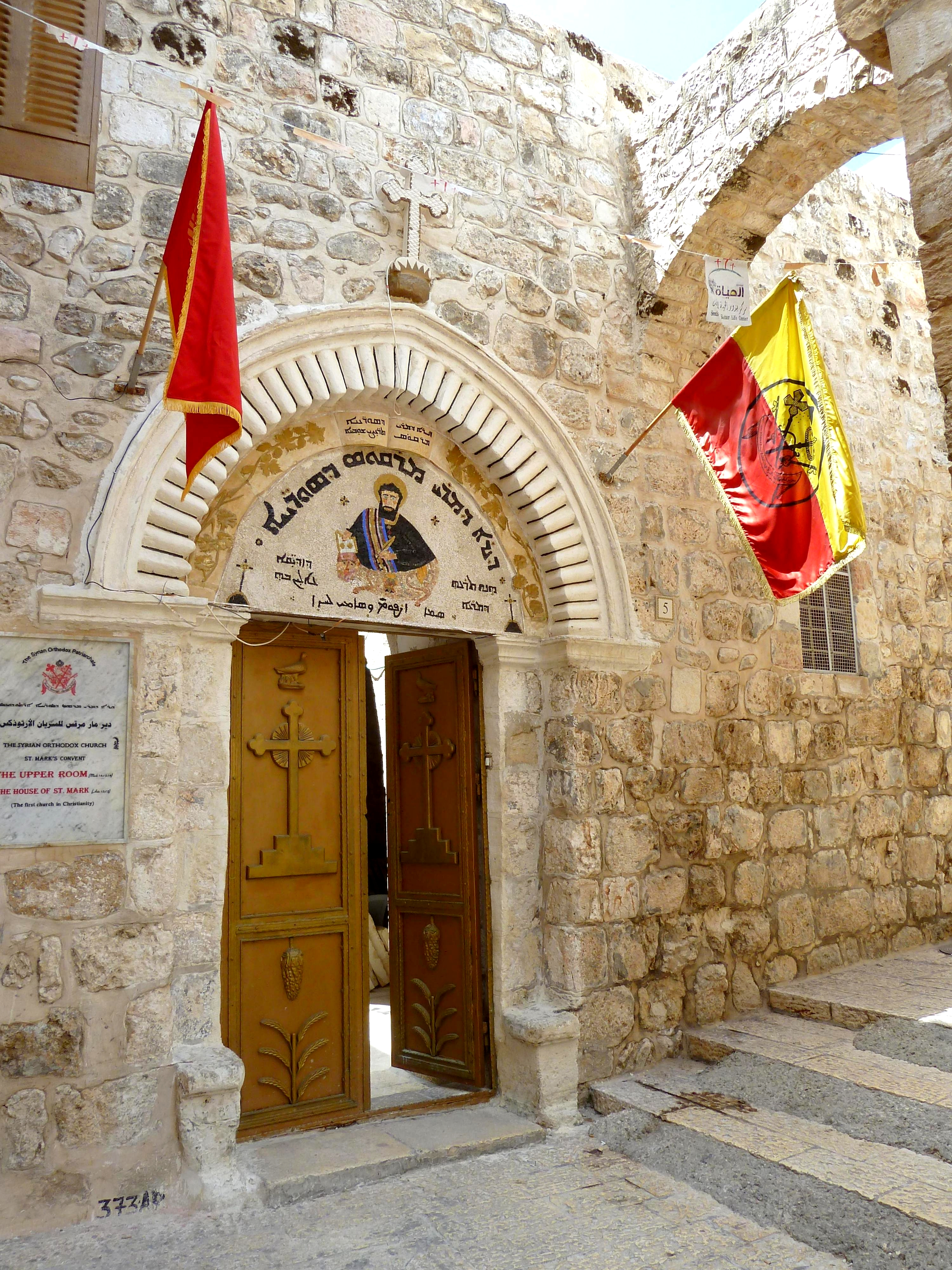
Syriac Orthodox monastery of Saint Mark, in the Old City of Jerusalem

Assyrians are predominantly Christians of the East and West Syriac Rite. The majority of Assyrians in the Holy Land (Israel and Palestine) are adherents of the Syriac Orthodox Church, while a smaller community of Catholic Assyrians also exists.

=== Orthodox Assyrians ===
==== Syriac Orthodox Church ====
The Syriac Orthodox Church is the largest Assyrian church, covered by the Archbishopric of Israel, Palestine and Jordan under the spiritual guidance and direction of Archbishop Gabriel Dahho.

The most notable monastery is the Monastery of Saint Mark in Jerusalem. The Syriac Orthodox Church also has sharing rights to the Church of the Holy Sepulchre and minor rights to the Tomb of the Virgin Mary where they possess an altar on the western side of the holy site.

=== Catholic Assyrians ===
==== Syriac Catholic Church ====
The Syriac Catholic Church has a Patriarchal Exarchate formed in 1892 and is based out of the Church of Saint Thomas in Jerusalem.

==== Chaldean Catholic Church ====
Since 1903, the Chaldean Catholic Church has been represented in Jerusalem by a non-resident patriarchal vicar. In 1997, the Chaldean Catholic Church established the Territory Dependent on the Patriarch which was previously governed as the Patriarchal Vicariate of Jerusalem within the Patriarch's own archeparchy.

== See also ==
- Assyrians in Israel
- Assyrian homeland
- Christianity in Palestine
