= Leather Leone =

American singer (born 1959)

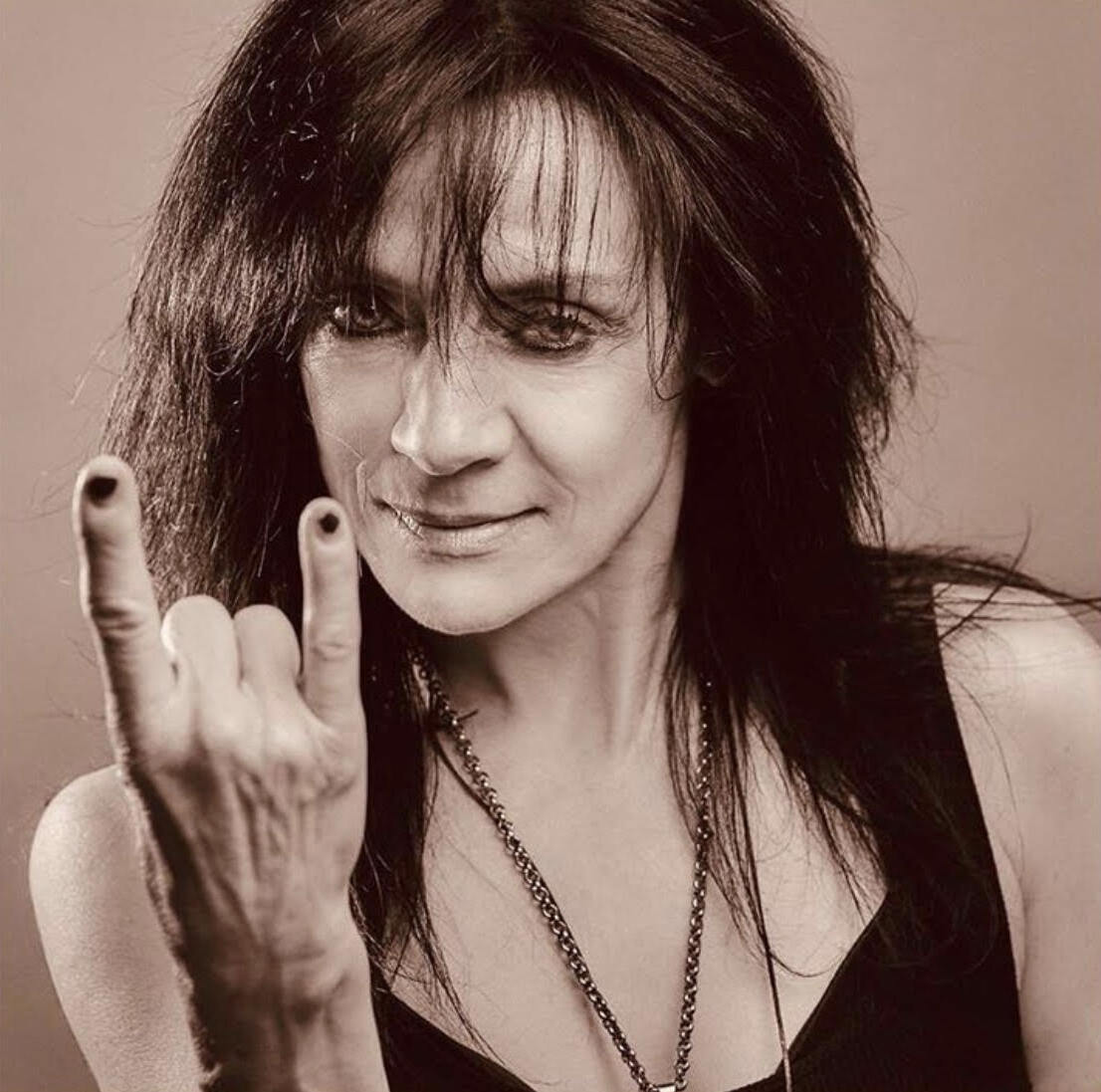

Background information
- Birth name: Catherine Anne Leone
- Born: March 22, 1959 (age 66); Rochester, New York, U.S.
- Origin: San Francisco, California, U.S.
- Genres: Heavy metal
- Occupation: Singer
- Years active: 1980s–1991, 2011–present
- Member of: Chastain, SledgeLeather / Leather
- Formerly of: Rude Girl
- Website: leatherleone.com

Catherine Anne Leone, known professionally as Leather Leone, is an American heavy metal vocalist, best known for fronting the groups Rude Girl and Chastain in the 1980s. She released one solo album, Shock Waves, in 1989, before taking a twenty-year break from the music scene. In 2011 she began performing again in The Sledge/Leather Project, which released a debut heavy metal album, Imagine Me Alive, in 2012.

== Career ==
=== Rude Girl ===
Leather Leone started singing in the early 1980s. She joined with drummer Sandy Sledge to start the all-female metal band Rude Girl in San Francisco, California. Leone handled vocals. The group began headlining metal shows in the San Francisco area, and were on stages with groups like Exodus and Megadeth. The band was asked to sign a seven-year record deal with Columbia Records, with producer Sandy Pearlman of Black Sabbath, but the band split before they recorded their first album. Rude Girl would morph into Malibu Barbi. Leather Leone guest sang on a released highly collectible "Rude Girls" 2-song 12" EP in 1987.

=== Chastain ===
Leone soon became lead vocalist of the band Chastain. The group was put together in 1984 by Mike Varney, president of Shrapnel Records for a David T. Chastain solo album. Varney had noticed the shred guitar ability of Chastain, member of the Cincinnati-based band CJSS and, at the same time, he wanted to create an output for the talent of young singer Leather Leone, formerly with the San Francisco band Rude Girl. She recorded five albums with him over six years, and the group at different points contained members from Alice Cooper, Cannibal Corpse, and King Diamond. After a long hiatus Leather Leone has begun recording with Chastain again. They released "Surrender to no one" in 2013. An uncut version of "Surrender to no one" in 2014. Chastain also released "We bleed metal" in 2015 on the Leviathan label. Chastain, with Leather Leone hasn't toured since 1990. However Leather Leone has once again begun to play shows as the voice of Chastain. In 2016 she began working with a new band in Brasil with tours in 2017, 2018 and 2019.

=== Solo albums and Sledge/Leather ===
"Her Father's Daughter"
Leon's vocals on "Her Father's Daughter" from the Sledge Leather album Imagine Me Alive

Leone released her debut solo album, Shock Waves, in 1989 on Roadrunner Records. The album was first released in 1989 through David T. Chastain's own label Leviathan Records. After a final tour in 1991, she disappeared from the music scene.

Leone resurfaced in 2011 to form the duo The Sledge/Leather Project with former bandmate Sandy Sledge on drums, and Matthias 'Matthew' Weisheit on guitar. The heavy metal duo released a debut album, Imagine Me Alive, in early 2012.

Leone has recently resurfaced with a band in Brasil. In 2016, 2018, and 2019, she did a South American and European tours with much success.

She has since released another two full-length studio albums: Leather II was released on April 13, 2018, via Divebomb Records in the United States and via High Roller Records in Europe; We Are the Chosen was released on SPV/Steamhammer in 2022.

== Discography ==
=== Malibu Barbi ===
- Rude Girls EP (1987)

=== Chastain ===
- Mystery of Illusion (1985)
- Ruler of the Wasteland (1986)
- The 7th of Never (1987)
- The Voice of the Cult (1988)
- For Those Who Dare (1990)
- The Reign of Leather (2010)
- Surrender to No One (2013)
- We Bleed Metal (2015)
- "We Bleed Metal 17" (2017)
- "1319" (2019)

=== Leather ===
- Shock Waves (1989)
- Leather II (2018)
- We Are the Chosen (2022)

=== Sledge/Leather ===
- Imagine Me Alive (2012)
