= Absu (band) =

American extreme metal band

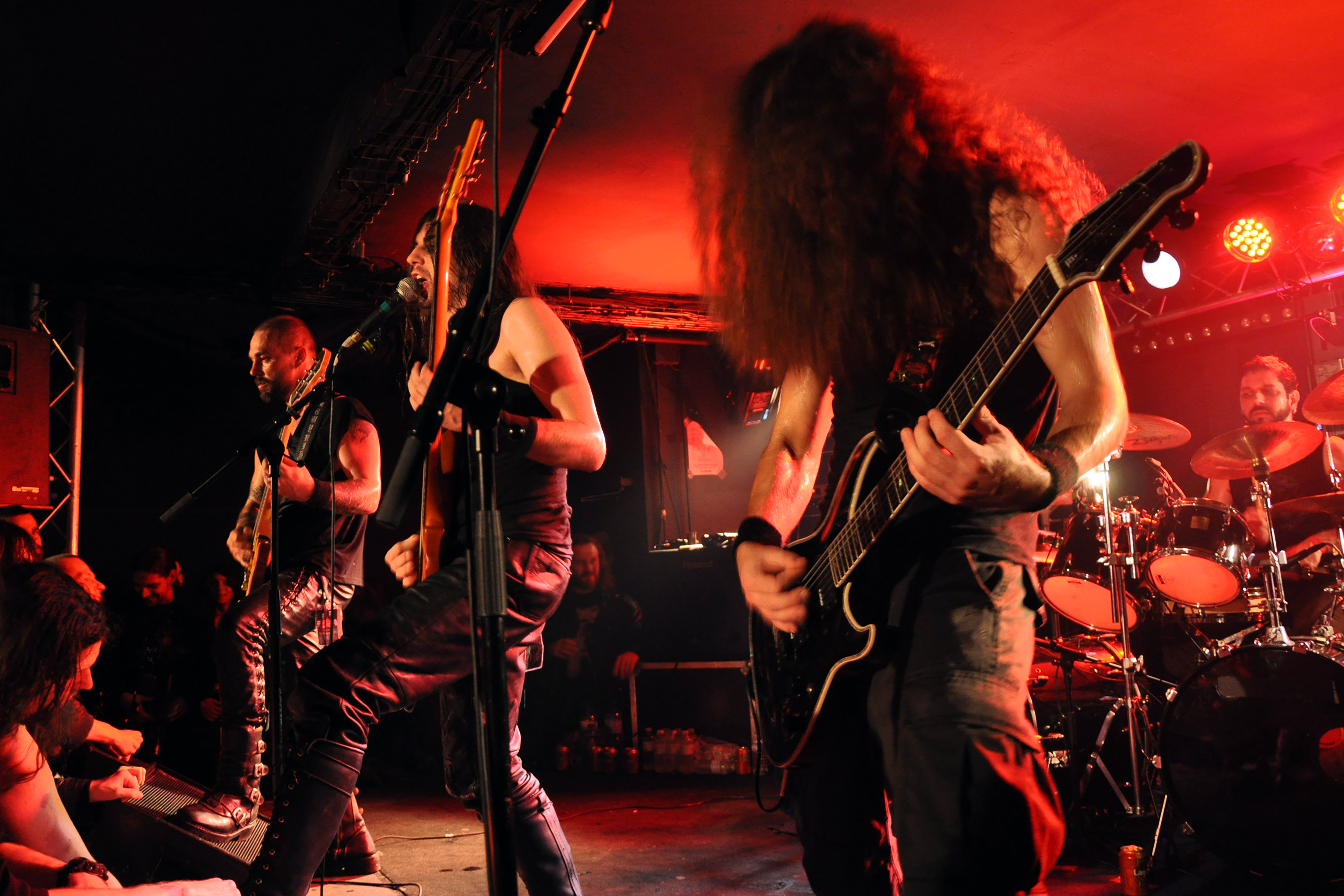
- Live in October 2009

Background information
- Origin: Dallas, Texas, United States
- Genres: Black metal, thrash metal, death metal (early)
- Years active: 1989–2002; 2007–2020; 2024–present
- Labels: Osmose, Candlelight
- Members: Proscriptor McGovern
- Past members: Ezezu; Aethyris McKay; Zawicizuz; Vastator Terrarum; Shaftiel; Equitant Ifernain; Kashshapxu; Daviel Athron Mystica; Black Massith; Mezzadurus; Gary Lindholm; Daniel Benbow; Melissa Moore
- Website: absuwebsite.wixsite.com/absu

Absu is an American black/thrash metal band from Dallas, Texas. Their demos and first album leaned toward death metal, but they later adopted the thrash/black sound for which the group became recognized. Their lyrical themes are esoteric, including elements of Celtic, Sumerian, and Mesopotamian myths and legends, alchemy, numerology, magick, and sorcery.

== History ==
The band originally formed as Dolmen in 1989, and after briefly taking the name Azathoth, they became Absu in 1991. The original members were Equitant Ifernain (guitars, bass, lyrics) and Shaftiel (guitars, vocals). After recording two demos and releasing an EP, they were joined by Proscriptor McGovern (Russ R. Givens – drums, vocals, lyrics), David Athron Mystica (guitars), and Black Massith (keyboards, synth, sequencing). After releasing their first album, Barathrum: V.I.T.R.I.O.L. in 1993, Absu narrowed their lineup to a three-piece when David Athron Mystica and Black Massith left. For live performances, they recruited Mezzadurus (from the Philadelphia black/thrash band Bloodstorm) and recorded as a three-piece, with Shaftiel and Proscriptor sharing vocal duties and Proscriptor also taking over keyboard and synth duties. The band remained with this lineup for some time. With their second album, The Sun of Tiphareth (1995), the band explored Sumerian, Mesopotamian, and Celtic mythology. The band's third album, The Third Storm of Cythraul (1997), drew inspiration from the Cythraul of Welsh mythology and continued their intellectual approach. Over the next four years, Equitant and Proscriptor worked with the ambient group Equimanthorn, and Absu's sole release was the EP In the Eyes of Ioldánach (1998).

In 2001, Absu recruited a new second guitarist, Kashshapxu. The band released their fifth album that year, Tara, which continued the Celtic theme of Cythraul and Ioldánach and featured bagpipes on the title track. The album is considered the band's masterpiece, and is described by McGovern as a concept album:

"The album is presented in a chronicled assembly dividing it into two phases: 'Ioldánach's Pedagogy' and 'The Cythrául Klan's Scrutiny.' Certain goals and objectives were finally accomplished with 'Tara,' through exploration of our ancestral attributes and channeling divisions of pure magic within our minds and souls."

This lineup was short-lived, as soon after recording Tara, Equitant left due to musical differences (however, he and Proscriptor still collaborate on other projects to this day). Shortly after that, Proscriptor severely injured his hand in an accident, which required surgery to repair it. After almost a year of healing and therapy, he was ready to play again, but Shaftiel no longer had any interest in Absu, and Kashshapxu had also left the band due to musical differences. Proscriptor then put Absu on hold and decided to work on other projects. During this period he auditioned for Slayer, but Slayer eventually went with their original drummer, Dave Lombardo. In 2005, Proscriptor and Equitant put together a collection of rare, live, and unreleased Absu recordings and released it under the title Mythological Occult Metal: 1991–2001 based on the suggestion of a fan.

With Absu still on hold, Proscriptor continued to work on other projects, including Equimanthorn (with Equitant and members of The Soil Bleeds Black; dark ambient music), Proscriptor (his own project of neo-folk/classic rock fused music), and Starchaser Network (with Equitant and Victorious; electronic art/rock band). Additionally, he was the drummer/vocalist for Melechesh for six years (1999–2005, although he still contributes lyrics and vocals) and has done session work with Judas Iscariot, Thornspawn, and Magnus Thorsen. Proscriptor also has his own record label, Tarot Productions.

In May 2007, Proscriptor finally announced the addition of Vastator Terrarum and Aethyris MacKay to the band. In early 2008, Absu announced they had signed with Candlelight Records for future recordings but would release a 7-inch EP through Relapse Records. That EP was Speed N' Spikes, a limited series featuring their first new material in seven years. In March 2008, Vastator Terrarum left and was replaced by Zawicizuz (formerly of the bands Infernal Oak, Rape Pillage Burn, and Bleed the Son). In October 2008, the band added ex-Panzram member Ezezu on bass and vocals, after completing the recording of their self-titled album, released on February 16 (Europe) and February 24 (USA), 2009, on Candlelight Records.

In September 2009, Zawicizuz left Absu and was replaced by Vis Crom, and the band immediately embarked on a European tour with Pantheon I, Razor of Occam, and Zoroaster.

In November 2010, Absu announced that they would be doing a six-date U.S. tour with Immortal in February 2011 as a three-piece, as Aethyris MacKay had left to join Pantheon I. After this tour, Absu entered the studio to record their next album, titled Abzu (released in October 2011), followed up with a tour.

In 2012, they released a single through Adult Swim (Williams Street Records) titled "Hall of the Masters," and later a video was produced for the song, their first official promotional video in 14 years (the previous being "Mannannan" in 1998). This song was later released on a 7-inch EP, titled Telepaths Within Nin-Edin. The band was working on the recording and post-production for their next album before fallout occurred, leading to the disbandment of the band.

The band played the Metal Threat festival at Reggies in Chicago in July 2016. In 2017, Melissa Moore was fired from the band after coming out as transgender while on tour. She later accused drummer-vocalist Proscriptor McGovern of transphobia in a public statement, where she claimed he told her "there is no place for a woman in this band" over a phone call. She threatened legal action regarding the use of material she had written before her dismissal.

On January 27, 2020, Absu announced on their Facebook page that they would dissolve the band after three decades of existence. The decision is explained in the farewell message:

"After meager deliberation and zero remorse, I have decided to dissolve Absu after three decades of existence. Collectively and universally speaking, this decision is finite due to insoluble circumstances, which has led to this ultimate result. No amount of time, exertion, formula or fashion can alter my verdict."

In July 2020, it was announced that Proscriptor McGovern had disbanded Absu to form a new version of the band called Proscriptor McGovern's Apsû.

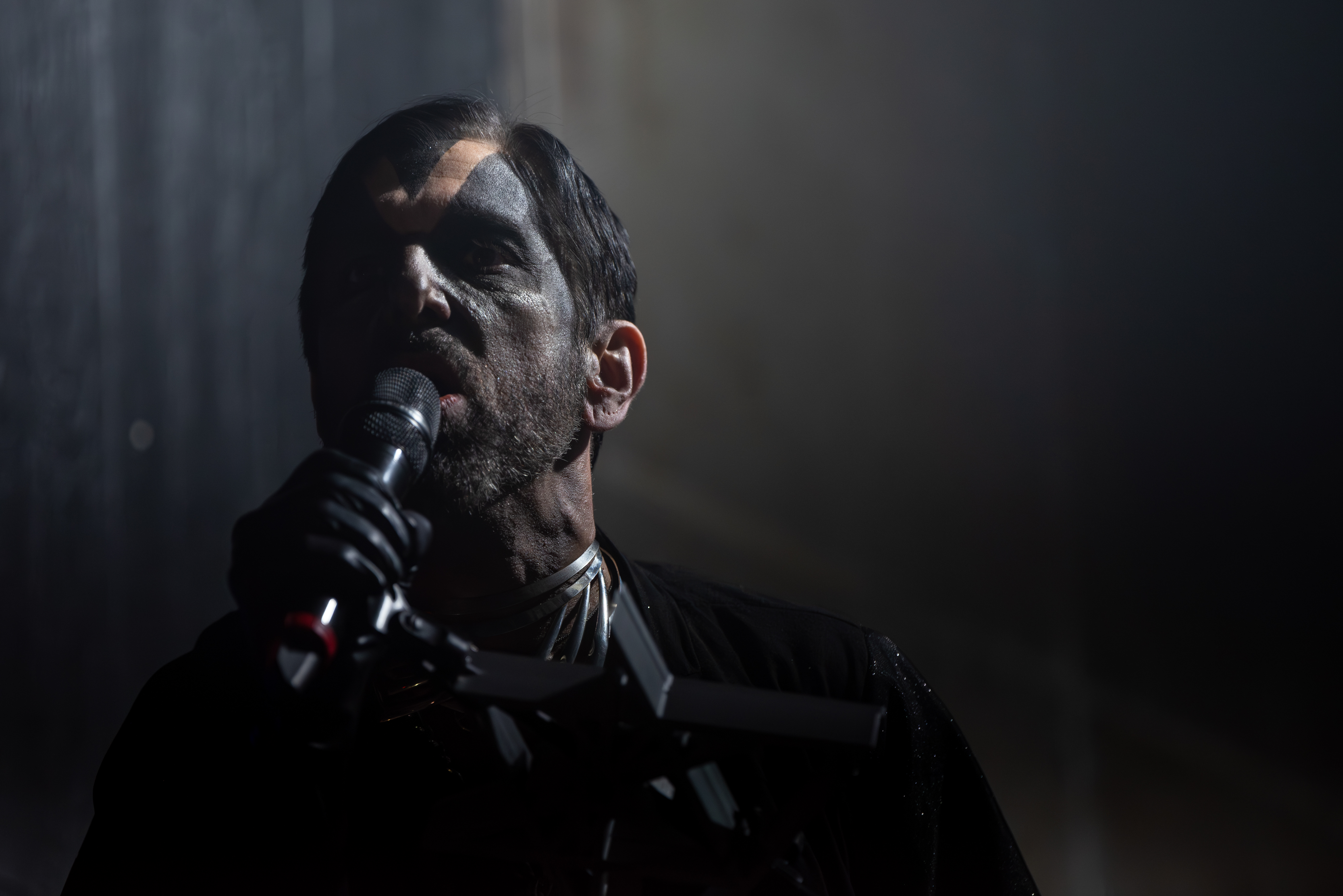
In concert during Mystic Festival 2025 in Gdańsk, Poland

In August 2024, it was announced that Proscriptor McGovern had reformed Absu and would embark on a tour celebrating the 30th anniversary of their 1995 album The Sun of Tiphareth.

== Discography ==
=== Albums ===
- Barathrum: V.I.T.R.I.O.L. (1993)
- The Sun of Tiphareth (1995)
- The Third Storm of Cythraul (1997)
- Tara (2001)
- Absu (2009)
- Abzu (2011)

=== EPs ===
- The Temples of Offal (7-inch EP, 1992)
- ...And Shineth Unto the Cold Cometh... (7-inch EP, 1995)
- In the Eyes of Ioldánach (EP, 1998)
- L'Attaque du Tyran: Toulouse, Le 28 Avril 1997 (7-inch EP, 2007)
- Split with Demonical (7-inch EP, 2007)
- Speed n' Spikes No. 2 (split 7-inch EP with Rumpelstiltskin Grinder, 2008)
- Split with Infernal Stronghold (split 7-inch Flexi EP, 2011)
- Telepaths Within Nin-Edin (7-inch EP, 2015)

=== Demos ===
- Return of the Ancients (1991)
- Immortal Sorcery (1991)
- Infinite and Profane Thrones (1992)
- Promo Tape 1993 (1993)

=== Additional releases ===
- In the Visions of Ioldánach (video, 2000)
- Mythological Occult Metal: 1991–2001 (compilation album, 2005)
- "Hall of the Masters" (Internet single/video released through Adult Swim's 2012 Single Series)
- Origin: War and Magick (Compilation of pre-Absu recordings, 2014)

== Members ==
Current

- Proscriptor McGovern (Russley Randell Givens) – lead vocals, drums, percussion, mellotron, lyrics, arrangements (1992–2002, 2007–2020, 2024–present)

Former

- Shaftiel (Mike Kelly) – guitars, vocals (1990–2002)
- Equitant Ifernain (Ray Heflin) – guitars, bass (1990–2002)
- Gary Lindholm – guitars (1990–1992)
- Daniel Benbow – drums (1990–1992)
- Daviel Athron Mystica (Dave Ward) – guitars (1992–1993)
- Black Massith (Brian Artwick) – keyboards, synth, sequencing (1992–1993)
- Aethyris McKay (Shandy McKay) – guitars, synthesizers (2007–2010)
- Zawicizuz (Geoffrey Sawicky) – guitars, keyboards and backing vocals (2007–2009)
- Vastator Terrarum – guitars, backing vocals (2007)
- Ezezu (Paul Williamson) – bass, backing vocals (2008–2020)
- Vis Crom (Melissa Moore) – guitars (2009–2018)

Session/live

- Mezzadurus (Chris Gamble) – vocals, bass (1995–2002)
- Kashshapxu (Rad Davis) – guitars (2001–2003)
