= David Chastain =

American guitarist

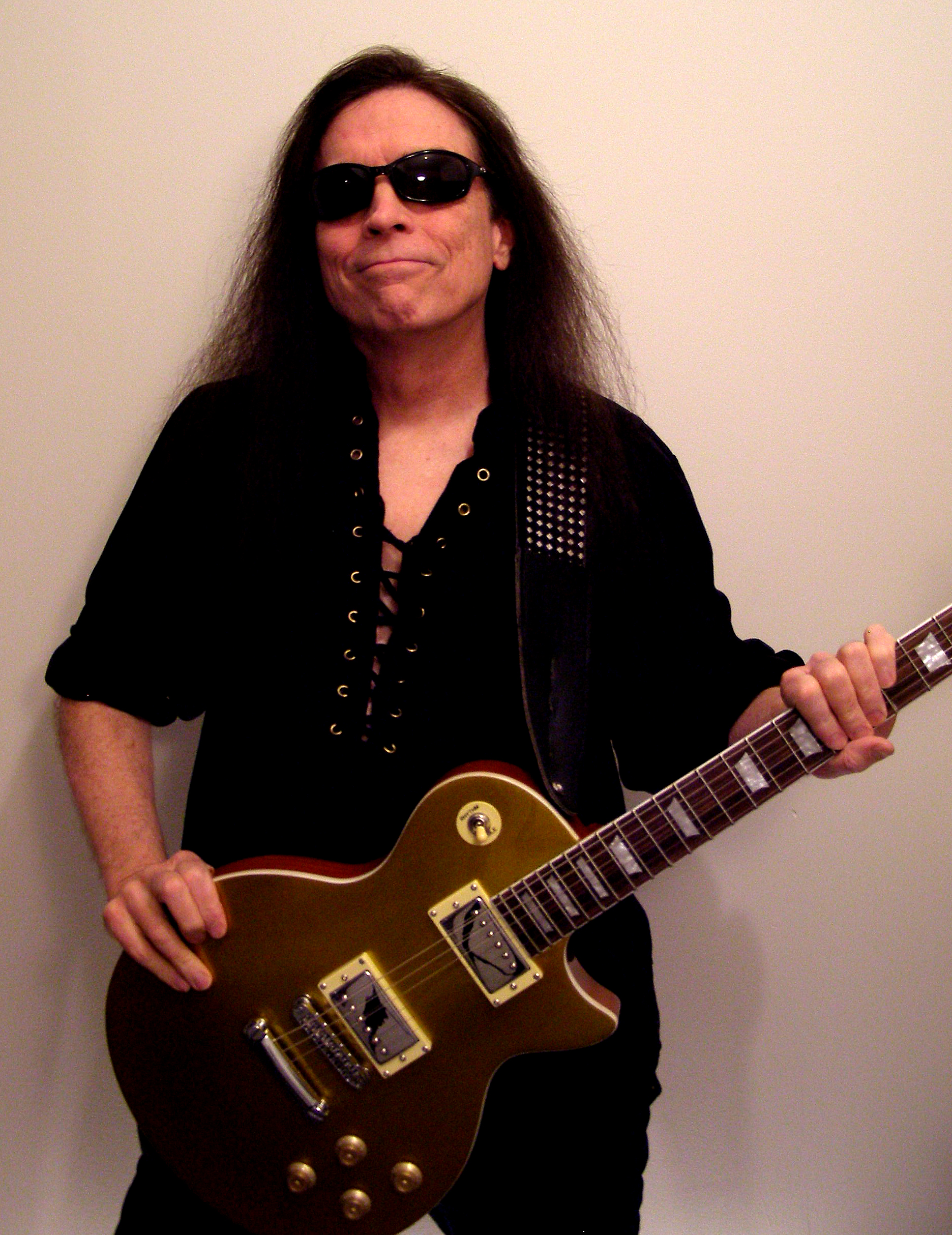

Background information
- Born: David Taylor Chastain; August 31, 1953 (age 72); Cincinnati, Ohio, U.S.
- Origin: Atlanta, Georgia, U.S.
- Genres: Heavy metal, hard rock, neoclassical metal, blues rock, instrumental rock
- Occupations: Musician, songwriter, record producer
- Instrument: Guitar
- Years active: 1980s–present
- Labels: Leviathan, Shrapnel
- Website: leviathanrecords.com/chaslist2.htm

David Taylor Chastain (born August 31, 1953) is an American heavy metal guitarist and the owner of Leviathan Records and Diginet Music.

Chastain emerged in the mid-1980s along with a wave of other neo-classical guitarists. He has released about 50 recordings under multiple names, including David T. Chastain, CJSS, Georgia Blues Dawgs, The Cincinnati Improvisational Group, SPIKE, Zanister, Ruud Cooty and Southern Gentlemen (blues-rock); as well as a number of heavy metal releases under the band name Chastain, accompanied by female vocalist Leather Leone.

In more recent years, Chastain has worked as a record producer at his own company, Leviathan Records. His label specializes in discovering and promoting new talents, specializing in guitarists and bands. He also runs Diginet Music, a company specializing in rare, unreleased or out-of-print music.

== Discography ==
=== Solo albums ===
- Instrumental Variations – 1987 Leviathan Records
- Within the Heat – 1989 Leviathan Records
- Elegant Seduction – 1991 Leviathan Records
- Movements Thru Time – 1992 Leviathan Records, Compilation album
- Next Planet Please – 1994 Leviathan Records
- Acoustic Visions – 1998 Leviathan Records
- Rock Solid Guitar – 2001 Leviathan Records
- Prisoner of Time – 2005 Diginet Music
- Countdown to Infinity – 2007 Leviathan Records
- Heavy Excursions – 2009 Leviathan Records, Compilation album
- Civilized Warfare – 2011 Leviathan Records

=== With Spike ===
- The Price of Pleasure – 1983 Starbound Records

=== With CJSS ===
- World Gone Mad- 1985 Leviathan Records
- Praise the Loud – 1986 Leviathan Records
- Kings of the World – 2000 Pavement Music

=== With Chastain ===
- Mystery of Illusion – 1985 Shrapnel Records
- Ruler of the Wasteland – 1986 Shrapnel Records
- The 7th of Never – 1987 Leviathan Records
- The Voice of the Cult – 1988 Leviathan Records
- For Those Who Dare – 1990 Leviathan Records
- Sick Society – 1995 Leviathan Records
- In Dementia – 1997 Leviathan Records
- In an Outrage – 2004 Leviathan Records
- The Reign of Leather – 2010 Leviathan Records
- Surrender To No One – 2013 Leviathan Records
- We Bleed Metal – 2015 Leviathan Records
- We Bleed Metal 17 – 2017 Leviathan Records

=== With Zanister ===
- Symphonica Millennia – 1999 Shark Records (David T. Chastain – Guitars, Keyboards, Production)
- Fear No Man – 2001 Leviathan Records (David T. Chastain – Guitars, Production)

=== With Southern Gentlemen ===
- Exotic Dancer Blues – 2000 Leviathan Records (David T. Chastain – Guitars, Vocals, Production)
- Double Your Pleasure – 2003 Leviathan Records (David T. Chastain – Guitar, Vocals, Production)
- Third Time Is the Charm – 2006 Leviathan Records (David T. Chastain – Guitar, Production)
- Valley of Fire – 2008 Leviathan Records (David T. Chastain – Guitar, Production)
- Instrumentalized – 2009 Leviathan Records (David T. Chastain – Guitar, Production)

=== Other appearances ===
- Shockwaves – Leather – 1990 Roadrunner Records (Music, Lyrics, Production)
- Live! Wild and Truly Diminished!! – 1992 Leviathan Records (David Chastain and Michael Harris)
- Masahiro Chono 21st Century Prelude – 1995 Teichiku Records ("Victory March ~ Shogeki ~," "After The Battle ~ Chikai Chi ~," "Victory March (Full Power Version) ~ Shogeki II ~")
- Aftermath – Ruud Cooty – 2002 Lucretia Records (David T. Chastain – Guitars, Arrangements, Production, Mixing)
- Burning Earth – Firewind – 2003 Leviathan Records (David T. Chastain – Production, Vocal Engineering, Additional Background Vocals)
- Hurricane X – Michael Harris – 2003 Leviathan Records (David T. Chastain – Bass, Executive Production)
- Armed and Ready – Joe Stump – 2003 Leviathan Records (David T. Chastain – Bass, Executive Production)
- Destination – Corbin King – 2004 Leviathan Records (David T. Chastain – Bass, Executive Production)
- Shredology/Midwest Shredfest – Joe Stump – 2005 Leviathan Records (David T. Chastain – Arrangements, Bass)

== Music videos ==
- "For Those Who Dare" – Chastain – 1990
- "Bullet From A Gun" – Chastain – 2004
- "Rise Up" – Chastain – 2013
- "Evil Awaits Us" – Chastain – 2014
- "I Am Sin" – Chastain – 2014
- "All Hail The King" – 2015
- "I live for today" – 2017
