= Mercyful Fate discography =

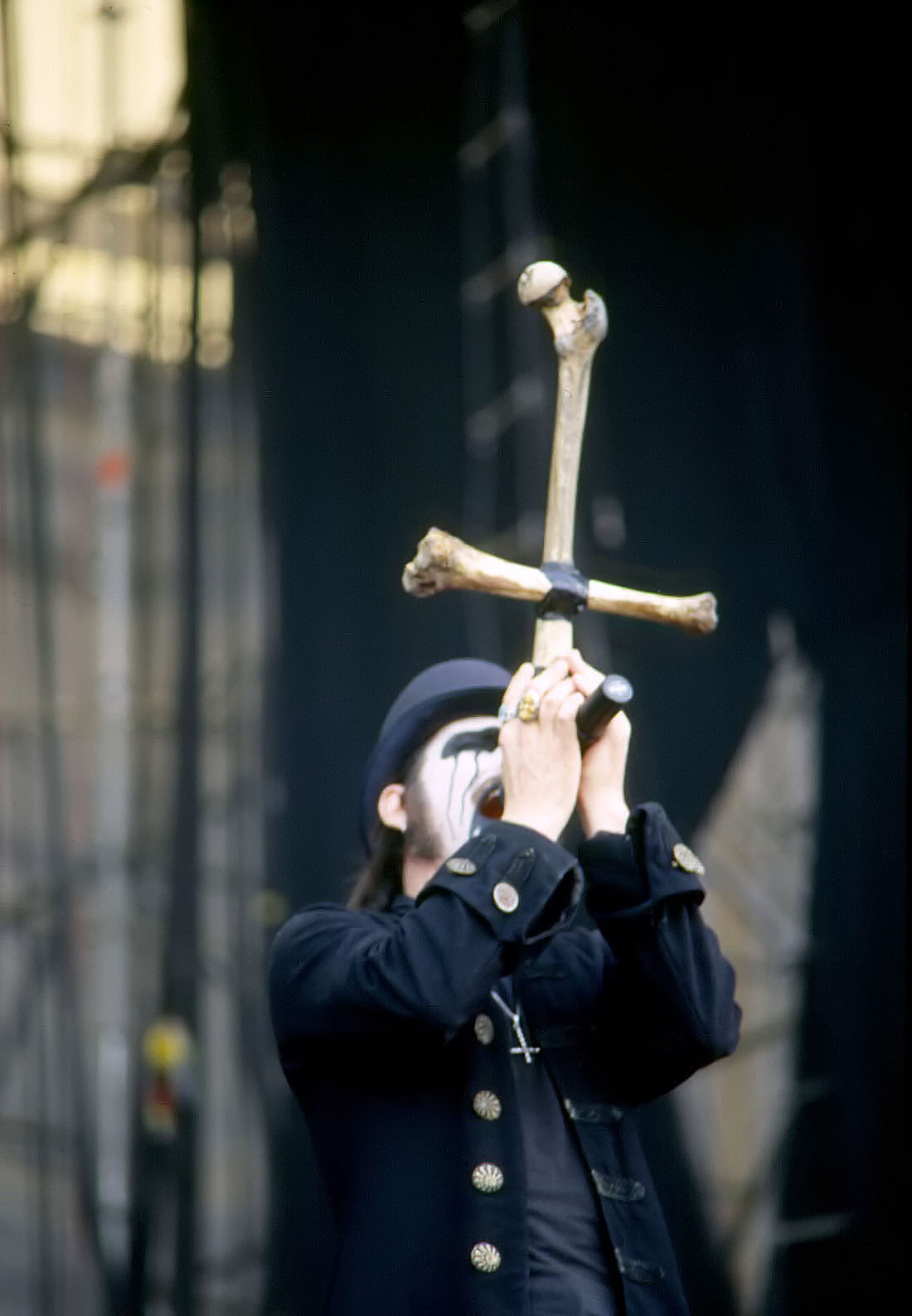
- Mercyful Fate vocalist King Diamond performing in 1999
- Studio albums: 7
- Extended plays: 2
- Compilation albums: 3
- Singles: 3
- Music videos: 6

The discography of Mercyful Fate, a Danish heavy metal band, consists of seven studio releases, three compilations, three singles, and six music videos. Mercyful Fate was formed in 1981 by vocalist King Diamond and guitarist Hank Shermann. After several line-up changes and self-made demos, Mercyful Fate released their self-titled EP in 1982, with the line-up of King Diamond (vocals), Hank Shermann (guitar), Michael Denner (guitar), Timi Hansen (bass) and Kim Ruzz (drums). With this line-up, the group released their debut album, Melissa, on 30 October 1983 through Roadrunner Records. The following year, Mercyful Fate recorded their second album Don't Break the Oath. Released on 7 September 1984, the album debuted at number 33 on the Swedish Sverigetopplistan charts. Despite winning a cult following around the world, with sales in the thousands, Mercyful Fate broke up in April 1985, due to musical differences.

In 1993, King Diamond, Hank Shermann, Michael Denner and Timi Hansen reunited to reform Mercyful Fate (drummer Kim Ruzz was replaced by Morten Nielsen). On 22 June 1993, Mercyful Fate released the album In the Shadows through Metal Blade Records. Following the supporting tour, the band released The Bell Witch on 27 June 1994, an EP of live tracks, as well as studio recordings from In the Shadows. On 25 October 1994, Mercyful Fate released the album Time, which was followed by Into the Unknown released 20 August 1996. Into the Unknown also charted at number 31 on Finnish album charts. On 9 June 1998 Mercyful Fate released the album Dead Again, and on 15 June 1999 the band released the album 9.

== Albums ==
=== Studio albums ===
Year	Album details	Peak chart positions	
Year	Album details	SWE	FIN
1983	Melissa: Released: October 1983; Label: Roadrunner; Format: CD, CS, LP	—	—
1984	Don't Break the Oath: Released: 7 September 1984; Label: Roadrunner; Format: CD, CS, LP	33	—
1993	In the Shadows: Released: 22 June 1993; Label: Metal Blade; Format: CD, CS, LP	—	—
1994	Time: Released: 25 October 1994; Label: Metal Blade; Format: CD, CS, LP	—	—
1996	Into the Unknown: Released: 20 August 1996; Label: Metal Blade; Format: CD, CS, LP	—	31
1998	Dead Again: Released: 9 June 1998; Label: Metal Blade; Format: CD, CS, LP	—	—
1999	9: Released: 15 June 1999; Label: Metal Blade; Format: CD, LP	—	—
"—" denotes releases that did not chart or were not released in that country.

=== Compilation albums ===
Year	Album details
1987	The Beginning: Released: 24 June 1987; Label: Roadrunner; Format: CD, CS, LP
1992	Return of the Vampire: Released: 12 May 1992; Label: Roadrunner; Format: CD, CS, LP
2003	The Best of Mercyful Fate: Released: 23 September 2003; Label: Roadrunner; Format: CD

== Extended plays ==
Year	Album details
1982	Mercyful Fate: Released: 8 November 1982; Label: RaveOn; Formats: CD, CS, LP
1994	The Bell Witch: Released: 27 June 1994; Label: Metal Blade; Formats: CD, CS, LP

== Singles ==
Year	Single details
1983	"Black Funeral": Released: December 1983; Label: Music For Nations; Album: Melissa; Label: Roadrunner
1993	"Egypt": Released: 1993; Label: Metal Blade; Album: In the Shadows; Label: Metal Blade
2009	"Evil": Released: 14 July 2009; Album: Guitar Hero: Metallica (video game); Label: Metal Blade

== Music videos ==
Year	Title	Director
1993	"Egypt"	John Kornarens
1994	"The Bell Witch"	John Kornarens
1994	"Nightmare Be Thy Name"	David Roth
1994	"Witches' Dance"	David Roth
1996	"The Uninvited Guest"	A. Coch
1998	"The Night"	Unknown
