= Hank Shermann =

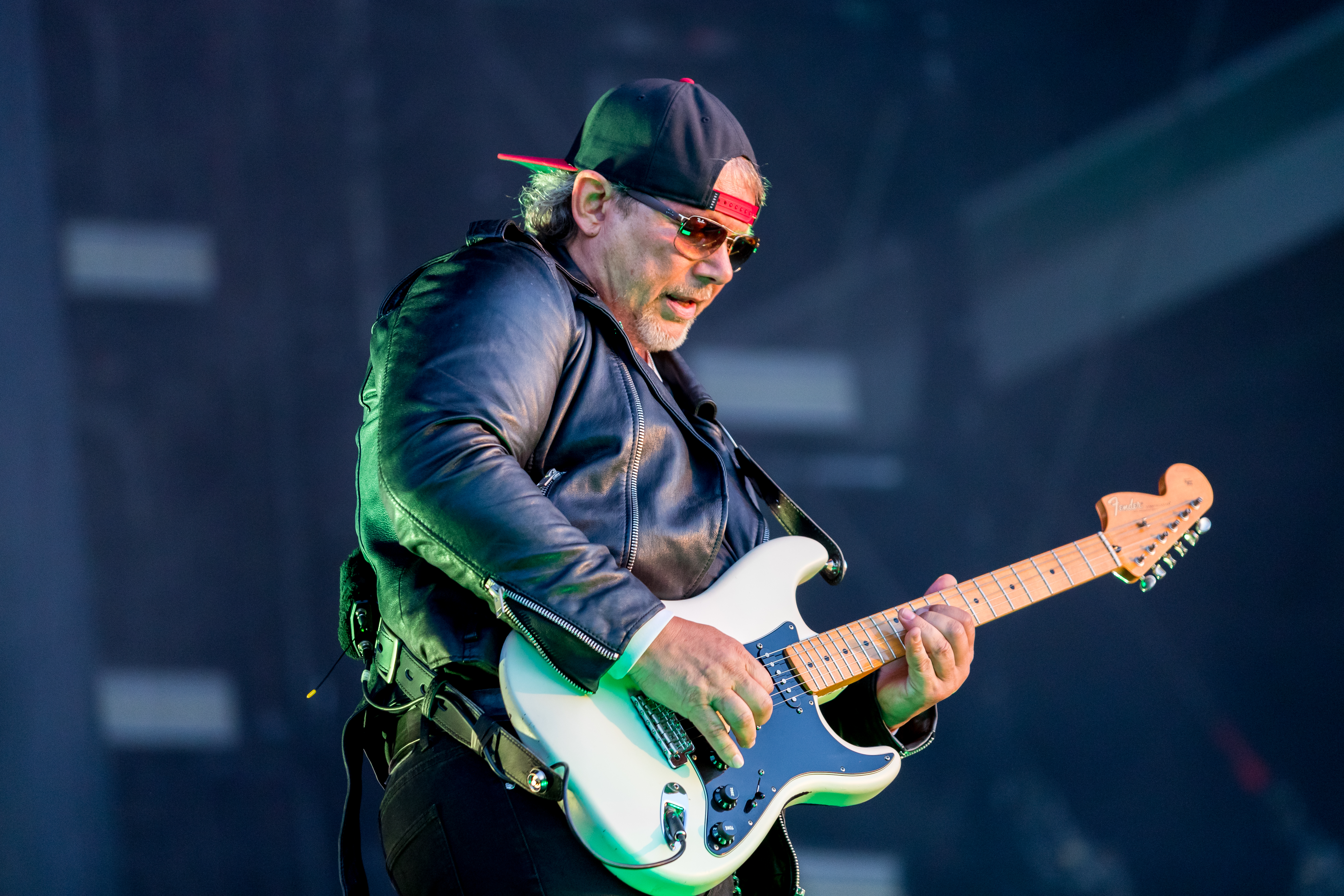
- Shermann performing with Mercyful Fate in 2022

Background information
- Born: René Krolmark; July 11, 1958 (age 68)
- Genres: Heavy metal; black metal; thrash metal; shock rock
- Occupations: Musician; songwriter
- Instrument: Guitar
- Years active: 1978–present
- Website: hankshermann.com

René Krolmark (born 11 July 1959), better known by his stage name, Hank Shermann, is a Danish musician best known for his work with the heavy metal band Mercyful Fate.

== Career ==
Shermann started playing guitar in 1977, influenced by the likes of Ace Frehley, Michael Schenker, Uli Roth, K.K. Downing and Glenn Tipton. In 1978 he co-founded and performed with the Danish punk band Brats (under the name Hank de Wank), where he first met future bandmates King Diamond and later Michael Denner. The band released one album and was dissolved in 1981 after a disagreement with their record label.

In 1981 he formed Mercyful Fate alongside King Diamond, where they deviated from punk music and started to write heavier songs. During this time Shermann composed all the music for 1983's Melissa and most of 1984's Don't Break the Oath, widely considered Mercyful Fate's most seminal albums. Mercyful Fate disbanded in 1985 due to creative differences, as Shermann wanted to create a more commercial approach.

Shermann formed and performed in the arena rock band Fate from 1984-1988, while King Diamond formed the eponymous King Diamond alongside Mercyful Fate members Michael Denner and Timi Hansen.

In 1992 Mercyful Fate reformed with four of the five original members, and after several lineup changes the group released five albums before going on hiatus in 1999. In 2002 Shermann and Denner formed the band Force of Evil and two albums were released.

In 2008 Shermann formed the band Demonica with Klaus Hyr, and released a single album before disbanding. In 2012 Shermann toured with Volbeat for 74 shows across North America, Europe and South America when they were supporting Megadeth. In 2014 he teamed up with his old bandmate Michael Denner to form Denner/Shermann, before the two disbanded in 2018.

Mercyful Fate reformed once again in 2019 and were planning to tour North America and Europe (however this has been delayed by the COVID-19 pandemic), with plans to release their first album in over two decades.

Shermann released his first solo single in 2019, and plans to release a full album in 2022.

== Equipment ==
Shermann's first guitar was a black Japanese Les Paul copy he bought for US$100. Shermann often tours with Gibson Flying Vs and Fender Stratocasters.

A signature Flying V was created for Shermann by 10-32 Guitars. The "HSV" features 27 frets and tremolo bar.

== Discography ==
=== Brats ===
- 1980 (1980)
- The Lost Tapes: Copenhagen 1979 (Compilation) (2008)

=== Mercyful Fate ===
- Mercyful Fate (EP) (1982)
- Melissa (1983)
- Don't Break the Oath (1984)
- The Beginning (1987)
- Return of the Vampire (1992)
- In the Shadows (1993)
- The Bell Witch (EP) (1994)
- Time (1994)
- Into the Unknown (1996)
- Dead Again (1998)
- 9 (1999)
- Evil 2009 (Single) (2009)

=== Fate ===
- Fate (1985)
- A Matter of Attitude (1986)

=== Zoser Mez ===
- Vizier of Wasteland (1991)

=== Gutrix ===
- Mushroom Songs (1997)

=== Virus 7 ===
- Sick in the Head (2000)

=== Force of Evil ===
- Force of Evil (2003)
- Black Empire (2005)

=== Demonica ===
- Demonstrous (2010)

=== Denner/Shermann ===
- Satan's Tomb (EP) (2015)
- Masters of Evil (2016)
