= Cruisin' for a Bruisin' =

Cruisin' for a Bruisin' may refer to:

- Cruisin' for a Bruisin' (Bruisers album) (1994)
- Cruisin' for a Bruisin' (Fate album) (1988)
- Cruisin' for a Bruisin' (Ol' 55 album) (1978)
- "Cruisin' for a Bruisin'", a song from Teen Beach Movie
- "Cruisin' for a Bruisin'", an episode of T.U.F.F. Puppy
