= The Graveyard (album) =

Studio album by King Diamond
- Released: September 1996
- Recorded: March–May 1996
- Studio: Dallas Sound Lab (Dallas, Texas); Los Angered (Gothenburg, Sweden)
- Genre: Heavy metal
- Length: 61:10
- Label: Massacre
- Producer: King Diamond; Tim Kimsey; Andy LaRocque

King Diamond chronology
| The Spider's Lullabye (1995) | The Graveyard (1996) | Voodoo (1998) |

Professional ratings
Review scores
| Source | Rating |
|---|---|
| AllMusic | 2/5 stars |
| Rock Hard | 8.5/10 |
| Sputnikmusic | 4.5/5 |

The Graveyard is the seventh studio album by Danish heavy metal band King Diamond, released in September 1996. It was the first album by King Diamond on the Massacre Records label and the last to feature drummer Darrin Anthony. The Graveyard is one of the most successful King Diamond's albums, peaking at No. 23 on the Finnish Charts and remaining for two weeks in the Top 40. The album was remastered by Andy LaRocque and re-released in 2009.

== Plot ==
In this story, King's character is an employee for a crooked, perverted and immoral mayor, Mayor McKenzie. One night, King's character happens to walk in on his boss molesting his daughter, Lucy. King doesn't keep quiet about this, but the mayor testifies that King is insane and has him locked up in Black Hill Sanitarium. After years of being there, King sees his chance to escape and takes it, strangling the nurse that arrives at his cell to administer his medication and stealing her keys. Now mentally destroyed, King runs off to the local graveyard to hide from the police. King plots his revenge against Mayor McKenzie, and begins killing people who pass through the graveyard at night. King is obsessed with an urban legend that if you die in a graveyard and lose your head, your soul does not escape, and it lives forever in your head. With that thought in the back of his mind, he kidnaps Lucy McKenzie, the mayor's daughter, and calls the mayor out to the graveyard for the two of them to play a game. Eventually, Mayor McKenzie does arrive after King calls him by phone. Before he arrives, King buries Lucy – still conscious – in one of seven empty graves, the tombstones of which read "LUCY FOREVER".

King eventually reveals himself to the Mayor and offers him a game. Mayor must dig out his little daughter from one of seven graves while wearing a blindfold. There are seven mounds, and he'll have three guesses or else he'll kill both of them. The Mayor gets the third guess right, but King knocks him out, dragging him to his tomb and tying him down.

While the Mayor slowly regains consciousness, King digs up Lucy and takes her out of the coffin while he starts to torture the Mayor. To King's surprise, Lucy ends up pulling down on a cord that sends a sheet of broken glass from a broken chapel window down on King, decapitating him. The urban legend King was obsessed with turns out to be true, as his living head beckons Lucy not to leave him as she walks away with her father. To his relief, Lucy takes King's head and puts it in her backpack, so King can be with her forever.

== Track listing ==
All lyrics are written by King Diamond; all music is composed by Diamond, except where noted.

| No. | Title | Music | Length |
|---|---|---|---|
| 1. | "The Graveyard" | | 1:22 |
| 2. | "Black Hill Sanitarium" | Andy LaRocque | 4:28 |
| 3. | "Waiting" | | 4:26 |
| 4. | "Heads on the Wall" | LaRocque | 6:20 |
| 5. | "Whispers" | LaRocque | 0:32 |
| 6. | "I'm Not a Stranger" | | 4:04 |
| 7. | "Digging Graves" | | 6:56 |
| 8. | "Meet Me at Midnight" | LaRocque | 4:47 |
| 9. | "Sleep Tight, Little Baby" | | 5:38 |
| 10. | "Daddy" | | 3:22 |
| 11. | "Trick or Treat" | | 5:09 |
| 12. | "Up from the Grave" | | 3:18 |
| 13. | "I Am" | | 5:51 |
| 14. | "Lucy Forever" | LaRocque | 4:57 |
| Total length: | | | 61:10 |

== Personnel ==
King Diamond

- King Diamond – vocals, keyboards, production, mixing
- Andy LaRocque – guitars, keyboards on "Whispers", production
- Herb Simonsen – guitars
- Chris Estes – bass
- Darrin Anthony – drums

Production

- Tim Kimsey – production, engineering, mixing
- Troy Scheer – assistant engineering
- Sterling Winfield – assistant engineering
- Howie Weinberg – mastering at Masterdisk, New York
- Brian J Ames – design, imaging

== Charts ==
| Chart (1996) | Peak position |
|---|---|
| Finnish Albums (Suomen virallinen lista) | 23 |
