= In the Shadows (album) =

Studio album by Mercyful Fate
- Released: 22 June 1993
- Recorded: February–April 1993
- Studio: Dallas Sound Lab, Dallas, Texas, U.S.
- Genre: Heavy metal
- Length: 53:28
- Label: Metal Blade
- Producer: King Diamond, Hank Shermann, Tim Kimsey; bonus track co-produced by Lars Ulrich

Mercyful Fate chronology
Return of the Vampire (1992)	In the Shadows (1993)	The Bell Witch (1994)

Professional ratings
Review scores
Source	Rating
AllMusic	4/5 stars
Collector's Guide to Heavy Metal	8/10

In the Shadows is the third full-length studio album by Danish heavy metal band Mercyful Fate. It is the first offering of the band since their reunion in 1992. This would be the final full-length album Timi Hansen would appear on before his death in 2019. The album was released on June 22, 1993, via Metal Blade Records. Unlike previous Mercyful Fate albums, which were entirely centered around lyrical themes of Satanism and the occult, the lyrics on this album are rather focused on more conceptual horror-themes, akin to King Diamond's work with his eponymous band. The band would return to a primarily occult/Satanic lyrical approach the following year on the Time album released in 1994.

Some editions of In the Shadows contain a bonus track, "Return of the Vampire... 1993", that is a re-recording of the song "Return of the Vampire", present in the homonymous 1992 compilation album, featuring Lars Ulrich of Metallica on drums.

The album cover was painted by Torbjorn Jorgensen / Studio Dzyan.

== Track listing ==
All lyrics are written by King Diamond.

No.	Title	Music	Length
1.	"Egypt"	Diamond	4:52
2.	"The Bell Witch"	Hank Shermann	4:34
3.	"The Old Oak"	Shermann	8:55
4.	"Shadows"	Diamond	4:42
5.	"A Gruesome Time"	Michael Denner	4:31
6.	"Thirteen Invitations"	Diamond	5:17
7.	"Room of Golden Air" (instrumental)	Denner	3:07
8.	"Legend of the Headless Rider"	Shermann	7:43
9.	"Is That You, Melissa?"	Diamond	4:41

Bonus track
No.	Title	Music	Length
10.	"Return of the Vampire... 1993"	Shermann	5:08

== Personnel ==
=== Mercyful Fate ===
- King Diamond - vocals
- Hank Shermann - guitars
- Michael Denner - guitars
- Timi Hansen - bass

=== Additional personnel ===
- Morten Nielsen - drums, except on "Return of the Vampire... 1993"
- John Marshall - harpsichord on track 9
- Lars Ulrich - drums on "Return of the Vampire... 1993"

== Production ==
- Brian Slagel: Executive producer
- Produced by King Diamond, Hank Shermann and Tim Kimsey
- Recorded by Tim Kimsey with assistance by Sterling Winfield
- Mixed by King Diamond and Tim Kimsey
- Digital editing by David Rosenblad and Thom Cacetta
- Mastered by Eddy Schreyer at Future Disc, Los Angeles

== Other Credits ==
- Cover Art by Torbjorn Jorgensen at Studio Dzyan
- Photography by Thomas Grondahl
