= Chris Estes =

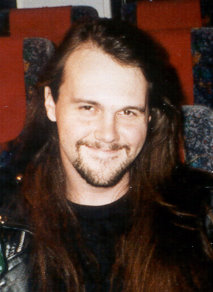

Background information
- Born: Christopher Douglas Estes; June 8, 1971 (age 55)
- Genre: Heavy metal
- Occupation: Musician
- Instruments: Bass guitar, guitar, keyboards
- Formerly of: King Diamond

Christopher Douglas Estes (born June 8, 1971) is a former King Diamond bass player (1994–1999). Originally from Dodge City, Kansas, Estes moved to Denton, Texas, in 1991 to attend the University of North Texas as a Jazz Studies major. During his time at UNT he met Darrin Anthony Stull and joined his unsigned Dallas band Mindstorm. During the next three years Mindstorm played the Dallas club scene and eventually caught the attention of Danish singer King Diamond (Kim Bendix Peterson), who had recently moved to the DFW area and was looking for new members for his solo act. In early 1994 three members of Mindstorm (Estes, Darrin (Anthony) Stull, and Herb Simonsen) were officially asked to join King Diamond. During his tenure with King Diamond, Estes recorded three albums and took part in three tours, in addition earning writing credits on the album Voodoo. Returning to college in 1997 and attending classes between studio sessions and tour, Estes eventually earned a degree in Computer Science. In the summer of 1999, Estes received word that the studio session for House of God had been postponed. Burdened by immediate financial needs, Estes reluctantly resigned his position in King Diamond. Estes lives and works in Richardson, Texas, as a computer programmer. Estes continues to write and perform music as a hobby in his free time.

== Discography ==
- King Diamond – The Spider's Lullabye (1995)
- King Diamond – The Graveyard (1996)
- Fakkulty – Southern Hostility (1996)
- King Diamond – Voodoo (1998)

== Photographic art ==
- Mercyful Fate – Into the Unknown (1996)
- King Diamond – The Graveyard (1996)
