= Voodoo (King Diamond album) =

Studio album by King Diamond
- Released: 24 February 1998
- Recorded: Norman Recording Studio
- Genre: Heavy metal
- Length: 61:57
- Label: Massacre
- Producer: King Diamond, Andy LaRocque, Sterling Winfield

King Diamond chronology
The Graveyard (1996)	Voodoo (1998)	House of God (2000)

Voodoo is the eighth studio album by Danish heavy metal band King Diamond, released on 24 February 1998. It is the first album to feature drummer John Luke Hébert and the last one to feature guitarist Herb Simonsen and bassist Chris Estes. The album cover was drawn by Kristian Wåhlin.

Voodoo was remastered by Andy LaRocque and re-released in 2009.

== Plot ==
Voodoo takes place in the year 1932 and deals with the affairs of the Lafayettes, a family consisting of Sarah (who is pregnant), David, and Grandpa. They move to an old colonial house on the Mississippi River, just north of Baton Rouge, which also happens to have been built next to a voodoo graveyard.

Unknown to the Lafayettes, the colonial house's servant, Salem, is involved in voodoo. Salem partakes in voodoo rituals at the graveyard, along with Doctor le Croix, a voodoo sorcerer, Madame Sarita, and Lula Chevalier, a girl who is never seen.

The Lafayettes hear the voodoo drums from the ceremonies in the graveyard. They call a secret meeting with Salem to discuss what should be done. The Lafayettes decide to destroy the voodoo burial ground. Salem does not want this to happen, so he sneaks out at midnight to talk to Doctor le Croix. Le Croix gives Salem money to buy some goofer dust, and tells him that the Lafayettes must all die.

Salem puts a snake in David's room, mixes haunted graveyard dirt in Grandpa's food, and, after talking to the dead Baron Samedi, pours goofer dust on Sarah while she sleeps. David and Grandpa become very ill, and Sarah becomes possessed with a voodoo spirit.

Grandpa manages to call Father Malone, an exorcist. Father Malone travels to the colonial house to rid Sarah of her possessor. He fails, and is rendered unconscious from exhaustion. While he is unconscious, Lula brings the heavy, nail-riddled ceremonial cross of Baron Samedi to the possessed Sarah. Sarah attacks Malone with the cross, almost killing him. Grandpa comes in and tells Sarah to stop, and she does, which saves Father Malone's life. Grandpa calls the police and ambulance, which arrive two hours later.

The story concludes with Salem speaking about the aftermath of the situation, which also reveals that he escaped the events of the mansion. He explains that the Lafayettes abandoned the old colonial house after leaving the hospital. Sarah's child was born and it was speaking "in the strangest tongue...backwards. Some expert had uttered the word...'Voodoo'..."

== Release ==
Voodoo is one of the best-selling King Diamond's albums. It peaked at #27 in the Finnish Charts, remaining four weeks in the Top 40, and it peaked at #55 in the Swedish Charts, but remaining for just one week.

== Track listing ==
No.	Title	Writer(s)	Length
1.	"Louisiana Darkness"	King Diamond	1:43
2.	""LOA" House"	Andy LaRocque, King Diamond	5:33
3.	"Life After Death"	King Diamond	5:40
4.	"Voodoo"	King Diamond	4:34
5.	"A Secret"	Andy LaRocque, King Diamond	4:04
6.	"Salem"	King Diamond	5:18
7.	"One Down Two to Go"	Chris Estes/Diamond, King Diamond	3:45
8.	"Sending of Dead"	King Diamond	5:40
9.	"Sarah's Night"	King Diamond	3:22
10.	"The Exorcist"	Andy LaRocque, King Diamond	4:52
11.	"Unclean Spirits"	Chris Estes, King Diamond	1:49
12.	"Cross of Baron Samedi"	King Diamond	4:29
13.	"If They Only Knew"	King Diamond	0:32
14.	"Aftermath" (The song "Aftermath" ends at minute 1:37. After 7 minutes of silence, at minute 8:37 begins a hidden track: it's the song "Unclean Spirits" played backwards.)	King Diamond	10:35

== Personnel ==
- King Diamond – vocals, keyboards, harpsichord, organ
- Andy LaRocque – electric and acoustic guitars, keyboards
- Herb Simonsen – guitars
- Chris Estes – bass, acoustic guitars, keyboards
- John Luke Hébert – drums, percussion
- Dimebag Darrell – guitar solo on "Voodoo"
- The Voodoo Story

== Charts ==
Chart performance for Voodoo
Chart (1998)	Peak position
Finnish Albums (Suomen virallinen lista)	27
Swedish Albums (Sverigetopplistan)	55
