= Fate (band) =

Danish hard rock band

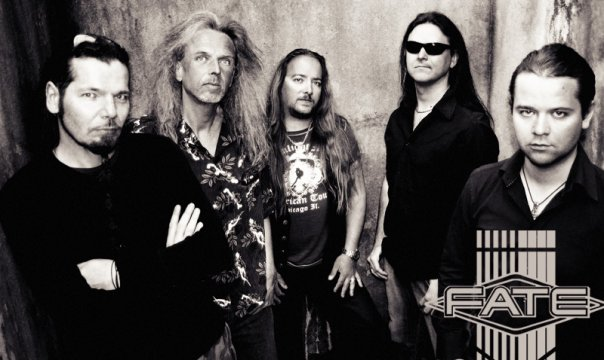

Background information
- Origin: Copenhagen, Denmark
- Genres: Hard rock, AOR, glam metal
- Years active: 1984–1993, 2004–present
- Labels: Capitol, EMI, MTM, AOR Heaven, Rubicon
- Members: Pete Steiner; Torben Enevoldsen; Søren Ryan; Patrik Törnblom; Peer Johansson

Fate is a Danish rock band originally formed in 1984. They released four albums between 1984 and 1990 before disbanding in 1993. However, after a one-off reunion at a German music festival in 2004, Fate was reformed and released a new album, V, in 2006. In 2010, the band released Best of Fate 25 Years on EMI and, in November 2011, the album Ghosts from the Past was released on AOR Heaven in EU and Rubicon in Japan.

== History ==
The band Fate formed when former Mercyful Fate guitarist Hank Shermann (René Krolmark), Maxim Reality singer Jeff "Lox" Limbo (Jens Meinert), bass / keyboard player Pete Steiner (Peter Steincke) and drummer Bob Lance (Bjarne Holm), met with producer Simon Hanhart. The band recorded Cruisin' for a Bruisin' in 1988, which featured the single "Lovers" (released as a single plus videoclip in 1988) and a new version of "Love on the Rox" from the band's debut.

== Personnel ==
=== Current members ===
- Pete Steiner (a.k.a. Peter Steincke) – bass, keyboards (1985–1993, 2004–present)
- Patrik Törnblom – keyboards (2024–present)
- Torben Enevoldsen – guitar (2011–present)
- Per Johansson (a.k.a. Peer Johansson) – lead vocals (1990–1993, 2004–2009, 2023-present)
- Søren Ryan – drums (2023–present)

=== Former members ===
- Hank Shermann – guitar (1985–1988)
- Jeff "Lox" Limbo (a.k.a. Jens Peter Meiner) – lead vocals (1985–1989)
- Bob Lance (a.k.a. Bjarne T. Holm) – drums (1985–1993)
- Mr. Moth (a.k.a. Jacob Moth) – guitar (1988–1990)
- Flemming Rothaus — keyboards (1988—1989)
- Per Johansson (a.k.a. Per Henriksen) – lead vocals (1990–1993, 2004–2009)
- Mattias "IA" Eklundh – guitar (1990–1992)
- Søren Hoff – guitar (1992–1993, 2004–2011)
- Nicklas Burman – keyboards (2004)
- Rasmus Duedahl – drums (2004)
- Mikael Kvist – drums (2005–2009)
- Dagfinn Joensen – lead vocals (2009–2016)
- Jens Berglid – drums (2010–2022)

== Discography ==
=== Studio albums ===
- Fate (1985)
- A Matter of Attitude (1986)
- Cruisin' for a Bruisin' (1988)
- Scratch 'n' Sniff (1990)
- V (2006)
- Ghosts from the Past (2011)
- If Not for the Devil (2013)
- Reconnect 'n Ignite (2024)

=== Compilation albums ===
- Best of Fate 25 Years 1985–2010 (2010)
- Back to the Past (Re-Recorded) (2022)
