= The Best of Mercyful Fate =

Greatest hits album by Mercyful Fate
- Released: 2003
- Recorded: 1982–1984
- Genre: Heavy metal
- Length: 76:40
- Label: Roadrunner
- Producer: Jac Hustinx, Henrik Lund, Mercyful Fate

Mercyful Fate chronology
9 (1999)	The Best of Mercyful Fate (2003)

Professional ratings
Review scores
Source	Rating
AllMusic	4/5 stars

The Best of Mercyful Fate is a compilation album by Danish heavy metal band Mercyful Fate from the years 1982 to 1984.

== Track listing ==
1. "Doomed by the Living Dead" (King Diamond, Hank Shermann) – 5:08
2. "A Corpse Without Soul" (Diamond, Shermann) – 6:56
3. "Nuns Have No Fun" (Michael Denner, Diamond, Shermann) – 4:20
4. "Evil" (Diamond, Shermann) – 4:45
5. "Curse of the Pharaohs" (Diamond, Shermann) – 3:57
6. "Into the Coven" (Diamond, Shermann) – 5:10
7. "Black Funeral" (Diamond, Shermann) – 2:50
8. "Satan's Fall" (Diamond, Shermann) – 11:23
9. "A Dangerous Meeting" (Shermann) – 5:11
10. "Desecration of Souls" (Denner, Shermann) – 4:55
11. "Gypsy" (Denner, Diamond) – 3:09
12. "Come to the Sabbath" (Diamond) – 5:19
13. "Burning the Cross" (Diamond, Benny Petersen) – 8:48
14. "Return of the Vampire" (Shermann) – 4:49

== Credits ==
- King Diamond – vocals, keyboards
- Hank Shermann – guitars
- Michael Denner – guitars
- Timi Hansen – bass
- Kim Ruzz – drums
- Benny Petersen – guitars
- Mark Hunter – liner notes
