= Return of the Vampire =

Compilation album by Mercyful Fate
- Released: 12 May 1992
- Recorded: 1981–1982
- Genre: Heavy metal
- Length: 50:15
- Label: Roadrunner
- Producer: Mercyful Fate

Mercyful Fate chronology
The Beginning (1987)	Return of the Vampire (1992)	In the Shadows (1993)

Professional ratings
Review scores
Source	Rating
AllMusic	3/5 stars

Return of the Vampire is a compilation album of rare demo tracks by Danish heavy metal band Mercyful Fate, recorded before their first, official release in 1982. It was released on 12 May 1992 through Roadrunner Records.

The album cover was painted by Torbjorn Jorgensen / Studio Dzyan.

== Track listing ==
All songs written by King Diamond (lyrics) and Hank Shermann (music) except where noted.

1. "Burning the Cross" – 8:49 (music by Benny Petersen)
2. "Curse of the Pharaohs" – 4:27
3. "Return of the Vampire" – 4:50
4. "On a Night of Full Moon" – 6:40
5. "A Corpse Without Soul" – 8:11
6. "Death Kiss" – 5:53
7. "Leave My Soul Alone" (music by Michael Denner) – 3:21
8. "M.D.A." (music and lyrics by Denner) – 4:20
9. "You Asked for It" – 4:13

== Personnel ==
The album was recorded by three different line-ups:

Tracks 1–6

- King Diamond – vocals
- Hank Shermann – guitars
- Benny Petersen – guitars
- Timi Hansen – bass
- Kim Ruzz – drums

Tracks 7–8

- King Diamond – vocals
- Hank Shermann – guitars
- Michael Denner – guitars
- Timi Hansen – bass
- "Old Nick Smith" – drums

Track 9

- King Diamond – vocals
- Hank Shermann – guitars, bass
- Carsten Volsing – guitars
- Jan "Musen" Lindblad – drums

=== Notes ===
- Tracks 1–5: recorded in Copenhagen, Denmark, late autumn 1981, Kharma Studio – from the "Burning the Cross" demo.
- Track 6: recorded in Hull, England, early spring 1982 – from a 1982 session in England for Ebony Records.
- Tracks 7–8: "Danger Zone" demo, recorded in Copenhagen, Denmark, summer 1981 at Brenner Studio.
- Track 9: Recorded in Copenhagen, Denmark, early spring 1981 – from "Demo 1" together with "Death Kiss" and "Running Away"
- "On a Night of Full Moon" was the original demo of "Desecration of Souls" from the Don't Break the Oath album.
- "Death Kiss" was the original demo of "A Dangerous Meeting" from the Don't Break the Oath album
- "Leave My Soul Alone" and "M.D.A." were originally songs from Michael Denner's band.
- "You Asked for It" was the original demo of "Black Masses"; the B-side of the "Black Funeral" single.
