= Timi Hansen =

Danish musician (1958–2019)

Background information
- Born: 28 October 1958
- Died: 4 November 2019 (aged 61)
- Genre: Heavy metal
- Occupations: Musician, songwriter
- Instrument: Bass
- Years active: 1981–2019
- Formerly of: Mercyful Fate, King Diamond

Timi Hansen (28 October 1958 – 4 November 2019) was a Danish bass player. He played in the Danish heavy metal band Mercyful Fate from 1981 to 1985 and from 1992 to 1993, and its successor project King Diamond from 1985 to 1987.

He played with his fingers rather than with a guitar pick.

Many have asked about how Hansen acquired "Grabber" as a nickname. Timi apparently used to play a Gibson G3 Grabber. A music store clerk began to call him "Grabber" and the name stuck. Aware that the meaning might be misunderstood, he slowly changed his stage name, Timi Grabber, back to his real name, Timi Hansen.

== Personal life ==
On 1 August 2019, King Diamond announced that Mercyful Fate would play on Copenhell and some tour concerts, but Hansen would not attend and was replaced by Joey Vera. He explained through Livia Zita's account that he was fighting cancer.

Hansen died on 4 November 2019, one week after his 61st birthday.

== Discography ==
=== With Mercyful Fate ===
- Nuns Have No Fun (1982)
- Melissa (1983)
- Don't Break the Oath (1984)
- The Beginning (1987)
- Return of the Vampire (1992)
- In the Shadows (1993)
- The Bell Witch EP (1994)
- The Best of Mercyful Fate (2003)

=== With King Diamond ===
- No Presents for Christmas (1985)
- Fatal Portrait (1986)
- Abigail (1987)
- The Dark Sides (1988)
- In Concert 1987: Abigail (1991)
- A Dangerous Meeting (1992)
- The Best of King Diamond (2003)
- Dreams of Horror (2014)
