= 9 (Mercyful Fate album) =

Studio album by Mercyful Fate
- Released: 15 June 1999
- Recorded: February–March 1999
- Studios: Nomad Recording Studio, Carrollton, Texas, US
- Genre: Heavy metal
- Length: 44:20
- Label: Metal Blade
- Producers: Kol Marshall and Mercyful Fate

Mercyful Fate chronology
Dead Again (1998)	9 (1999)	The Best of Mercyful Fate (2003)

Professional ratings
Review scores
Source	Rating
AllMusic	2.5/5 stars
Blistering	(unfavorable)
Chronicles of Chaos	7.5/10
Collector's Guide to Heavy Metal	9/10
Rock Hard	9.0/10

9 is the seventh studio album by Danish heavy metal band Mercyful Fate. It was recorded during February and March 1999 and was released on 15 June 1999 through Metal Blade Records. This album continues the heavier sound that was introduced in their previous album Dead Again, and also marks the continuation of the Satanic and occult-based lyrical themes which were prevalent during the band's first incarnation and were reintroduced on 1994’s Time album, as the primary lyrical focus. 9 was Mercyful Fate's last studio album before their twenty-year hiatus from 1999 to 2019.

== Track listing ==
All lyrics are written by King Diamond.

No.	Title	Music	Length
1.	"Last Rites"	Hank Shermann	4:12
2.	"Church of Saint Anne"	Shermann	4:44
3.	"Sold My Soul"	Diamond	5:04
4.	"House on the Hill"	Shermann	3:43
5.	"Burn in Hell"	Diamond	3:49
6.	"The Grave"	Shermann	4:09
7.	"Insane"	Shermann	3:01
8.	"Kiss the Demon"	Diamond	3:53
9.	"Buried Alive"	Diamond	4:53
10.	"9"	Mike Wead	4:31

Japanese release bonus track
No.	Title	Music	Length
11.	"S.H."	Diamond	2:21

== Personnel ==
Mercyful Fate

- King Diamond – vocals
- Hank Shermann – guitars
- Mike Wead – guitars
- Sharlee D'Angelo – bass
- Bjarne T. Holm – drums

Additional musicians

- Kol Marshall – keyboards

Production

- Kol Marshall – production, engineering, mixing with Mercyful Fate
- Vince Rossi – engineering
