= The Spider's Lullabye =

Studio album by King Diamond
- Released: 6 June 1995
- Recorded: September–October 1994
- Genre: Heavy metal
- Length: 47:19
- Label: Metal Blade
- Producer: King Diamond

King Diamond chronology
| A Dangerous Meeting (1992) | The Spider's Lullabye (1995) | The Graveyard (1996) |

Professional ratings
Review scores
| Source | Rating |
|---|---|
| Allmusic | 4/5 stars |

The Spider's Lullabye is the sixth studio album by Danish heavy metal band King Diamond, released on 6 June 1995. Unlike other King Diamond albums, it is not a full concept album; only half the songs form a single plot.

The album was recorded after a four-year hiatus and this is the first release to feature guitarist Herb Simonsen, bassist Chris Estes and drummer Darrin Anthony. It is also the band's first release on Metal Blade Records. Guitarist Andy LaRocque said it was the most difficult King Diamond album to record because "we had a new band [and] we had a totally new environment recording in the U.S., with a totally different producer."

The album was remastered by LaRocque and re-released in 2009.

== Summary ==
The first half of the songs on this album are listed as a variety of short stories before the second half form the plot.

"From the Other Side"

Tells about the protagonist's struggle with an out-of-body experience, forcing himself to come back to life before it is too late.

"Killer"

Describes a Richard Ramirez-type serial killer who is being put to death by an electric chair.

"The Poltergeist"

Revolves around a ghost hunter who detects a spirit in their home. Fearing the invading ghost is evil, we are left unsure of the ghost's personality. The song ends with the ghost overcoming the hunter, who allows the ghost to "stay forever".

"Dreams"

Is about a man suffering a series of terrifying nightmares and encountering she-demons in the form of little girls who take him to what appears to be a paradise that exists on the opposite side of waterfalls in which they were swimming in. The sleepers finds out the little girls are not what they appear to be and scream to escape the nightmare.

"Moonlight"

Tells about a group of cursed children, similar to the 1960 movie Village of the Damned.

"Six Feet Under"

The song tells the story of a person being buried alive in a glass coffin by their family; the story is similar to the ending of Conspiracy.

"The Spider's Lullabye"

Focuses on a reclusive man named Harry who is terrified of spiders and, out of desperation, seeks a doctor who can cure his arachnophobia.

"Eastmann's Cure"

The plot continues as Harry answers an ad in the local newspaper, about a psychiatric hospital that specializes in curing phobias of all kinds. The character of Dr. Eastmann is introduced as a kind, friendly physician who hides his true intentions from Harry.

"Room 17"

A confident Harry awaits Dr. Eastmann and his assistant Nurse Needle Dear to begin his treatment. The so-called "treatment," however, turns out to be little more than a torture session as Nurse Needle releases a wolf spider from the "Crawly Box". The next day, Harry complains of having pain and a weird sensation in his neck. Dr. Eastmann dismisses Harry's comments and thinks nothing more of it. The same night, when Harry is discovered by staff, they find him long dead and covered from head to toe in a spider web-like cocoon giving evidence that a series of spiders have wrapped him up like a fly, saving his dead body for consumption. Dr. Eastmann comes to the realization that Harry clearly died of fright, possibly the result of a heart attack.

"To the Morgue"

Harry, whose body is now reduced to bones and skin, is taken to the morgue. The coolers here are full of corpses (likely the result of Dr. Eastmann's experiments), and many more lie in the hallways. The narrative ends with spiders nesting in Harry's empty eye sockets.

== Track listing ==
| No. | Title | Writer(s) | Length |
|---|---|---|---|
| 1. | "From the Other Side" | King Diamond | 3:51 |
| 2. | "Killer" | King Diamond, Andy LaRocque | 4:17 |
| 3. | "The Poltergeist" | King Diamond | 4:29 |
| 4. | "Dreams" | King Diamond | 4:39 |
| 5. | "Moonlight" | King Diamond | 4:32 |
| 6. | "Six Feet Under" | King Diamond, Andy LaRocque | 4:02 |
| 7. | "The Spider's Lullabye" | King Diamond | 3:39 |
| 8. | "Eastmann's Cure" | King Diamond | 4:32 |
| 9. | "Room 17" | King Diamond | 8:17 |
| 10. | "To the Morgue" | King Diamond, Andy LaRocque | 4:57 |

== Personnel ==
- King Diamond - vocals, keyboards
- Andy LaRocque - guitars, keyboards
- Herb Simonsen - guitars
- Chris Estes - bass
- Darrin Anthony - drums
