= Mercyful Fate =

Danish heavy metal band

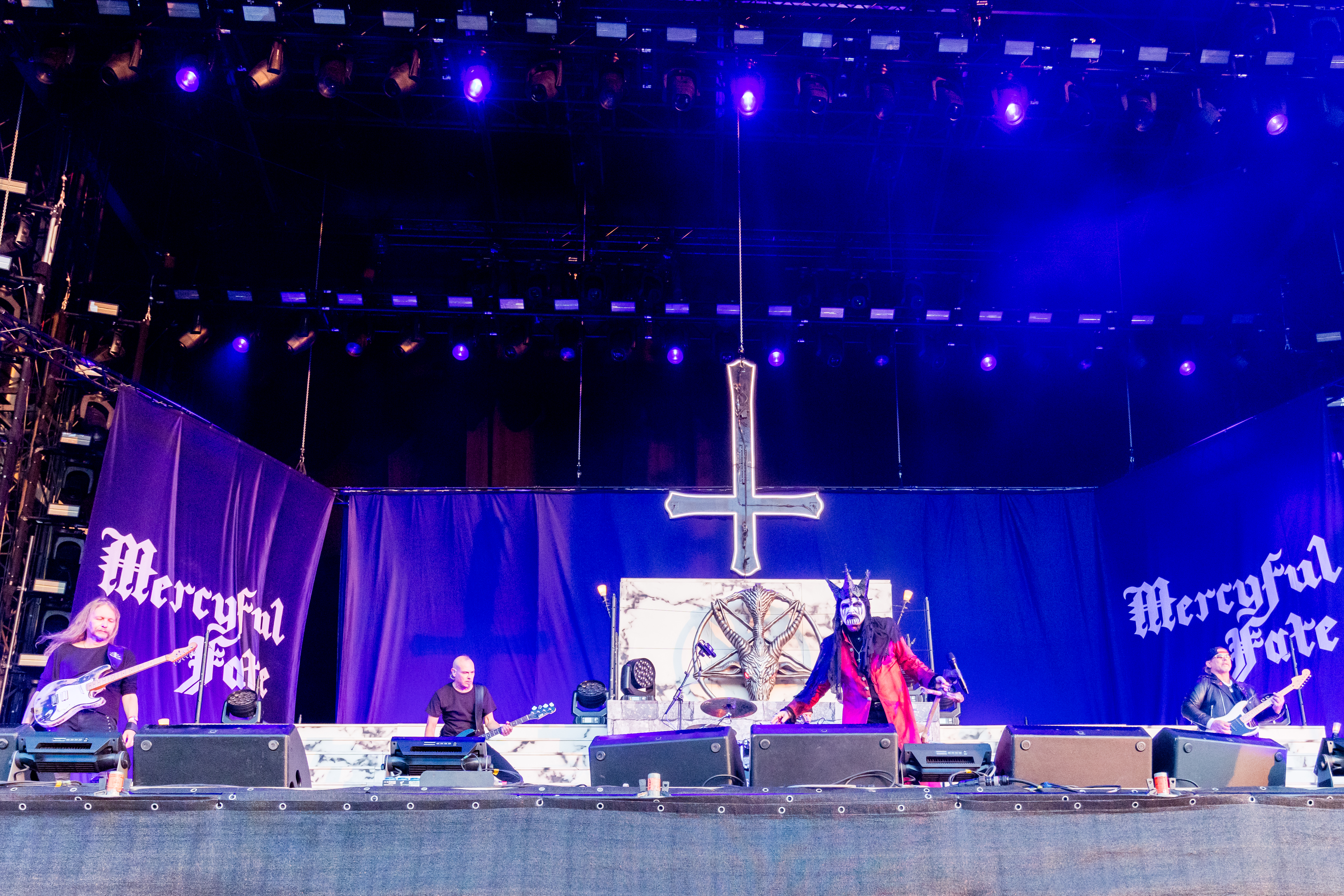
- Mercyful Fate performing in 2022

Background information
- Origin: Copenhagen, Denmark
- Genres: Heavy metal; first-wave black metal
- Works: Discography
- Years active: 1981–1985; 1992–1999; 2008; 2011; 2019–present
- Labels: Roadrunner; Metal Blade
- Spinoffs: King Diamond
- Members: King Diamond; Hank Shermann; Bjarne T. Holm; Mike Wead; Becky Baldwin
- Past members: Carsten Van Der Volsing; Jan Lindbla; Timi Hansen; Sharlee D'Angelo; Nick Smith; Kim Ruzz; Benny Petersen; Michael Denner; Morten Nielsen; Ole Frausing Andresen; Jan Flegdahl Rehmeier; Snowy Shaw; Ole Beich; Joey Vera
- Website: mercyfulfatecoven.com

Mercyful Fate is a Danish heavy metal band from Copenhagen, formed in 1981 by vocalist King Diamond and guitarist Hank Shermann. Influenced by progressive rock and hard rock, and with lyrics dealing with LaVeyan Satanism (often with ironic or sardonic use of Christian themes) and the occult, Mercyful Fate was part of the first wave of black metal in the early to mid-1980s, along with Venom and Bathory. The band is also cited as a formative influence to the then-nascent genres of thrash metal and death metal, as well as the Norwegian black metal scene.

Since its inception in 1981, Mercyful Fate has released seven studio albums, two extended plays, and four compilation albums. After several line-up changes and self-made demos, they released their self-titled EP in 1982, with the line-up of King Diamond (vocals), Hank Shermann (lead and rhythm guitars), Michael Denner (rhythm and lead guitars), Timi Hansen (bass), and Kim Ruzz (drums). With this line-up, the group recorded its first two studio albums: 1983's Melissa and 1984's Don't Break the Oath. In spite of their reputation as one of the most acclaimed bands of the European heavy metal scene of the 1980s, Mercyful Fate was the subject of controversy due to their satanic imagery, and one of their songs "Into the Coven" (from Melissa) later gained notoriety for appearing as one of the PMRC's "Filthy Fifteen" list of objectionable songs.

After disbanding in 1985 due to musical differences, four out of the five members of Mercyful Fate reunited in 1992 and recorded the album In the Shadows, which was released the following year. During the 1990s, the band released four more studio albums and went through several line-up changes. Mercyful Fate went on hiatus in 1999, but had reunited on occasion during the 2000s. On August 1, 2019, it was announced that Mercyful Fate was reuniting on a more permanent basis, with plans to tour and release a new album, which will be their first since 9 in 1999.

The staff of Loudwire named Mercyful Fate the 35th best metal band of all time.

== History ==
=== Formation and first releases (1981–1985) ===
Mercyful Fate was originally formed in Copenhagen in the spring of 1981, following the dissolution of the band Brats. Brats were a punk/metal band featuring future Mercyful Fate members King Diamond and guitarists Hank Shermann and Michael Denner. After two studio albums and several line-up changes (including the addition of Diamond and the departure of Denner), Diamond and Shermann began writing new material that was much heavier than any of Brats' previous work. The band's record label CBS was not pleased with the material, and demanded they stop singing in English and become more commercial. As a result, Diamond and Shermann quit the group and went on to form Mercyful Fate. Former Rock Nalle bassist Ole Beich (later of L.A. Guns and Guns N' Roses) briefly joined the band around this time. After several line-up changes and semi-professional demo tapes, Mercyful Fate released their self-titled EP in 1982. This line-up consisted of King Diamond, Hank Shermann, bassist Timi Hansen, drummer Kim Ruzz and guitarist Michael Denner.

In July 1983, Mercyful Fate recorded their debut album at Easy Sound Recording in Copenhagen. Entitled Melissa, the album was produced by Henrik Lund and released in October 1983 through Roadrunner Records. Melissa has been referred to as "one of the first records to start to develop an 'extreme metal' sound" and was major influence on the then-emerging thrash metal, death metal and black metal genres. The character of Melissa, a witch who was burned at the stake, appears for the first time on the eponymous debut album and intermittently throughout the band's later work. One of the album's tracks, "Into the Coven", received particular attention two years later, when it was listed by the Parents Music Resource Center (PMRC) as one of their "Filthy Fifteen" songs due to its perceived occult content. King Diamond was, in reality, interested in LaVeyan Satanism, which he called "a life philosophy" and stated that it had nothing to do with the Devil of Abrahamic religions. After a number of concerts around Denmark, Mercyful Fate entered the studio in May 1984 to record their second studio album Don't Break the Oath, which was released on September 7, 1984. During the album's supporting tour, the band played the US for two months and made festival appearances in Germany. Despite winning a cult following around the world, Mercyful Fate broke up in April 1985, due to musical differences. Guitarist Hank Shermann wanted the band to move to a more commercial sound; King Diamond refused and announced his departure from Mercyful Fate, which led to the band breaking up.

=== After disbanding (1985–1992) ===
After Mercyful Fate broke up, King Diamond, along with Michael Denner and Timi Hansen, formed the eponymous King Diamond band. Both Denner and Hansen stayed with the group until 1987's Abigail, after which both left King Diamond. They were replaced by Mike Moon and Hal Patino, respectively, and King Diamond continued releasing albums even after Mercyful Fate had reformed. After leaving King Diamond, Denner opened up a recordshop in Copenhagen, until 1988, when he formed the band Lavina (which would later become Zoser Mez), along with former bandmate Hank Shermann. Hank Shermann had formed the hard rock band Fate in 1985, after having left Mercyful Fate. With Fate, Shermann released two albums: 1985's Fate and 1986's A Matter of Attitude. After leaving the band, Shermann joined-up with Michael Denner to form Lavina.

During the time Mercyful Fate were disbanded, Roadrunner Records released three Mercyful Fate compilation albums. The Beginning was released on June 24, 1987, and featured material from the band's 1982 self-titled EP, as well as rare live and studio recordings. On May 12, 1992, Return of the Vampire was released, which was another compilation of rare studio recordings. On October 6, 1992, Roadrunner Records released A Dangerous Meeting, a greatest hits album under the King Diamond name, featuring material from both Mercyful Fate and King Diamond.

=== Reunion (1992–1999) ===
In 1992, King Diamond, Hank Shermann, Michael Denner and Timi Hansen reunited to reform Mercyful Fate (drummer Kim Ruzz was replaced by Morten Nielsen). The result was the band's third album In the Shadows, which was released on June 22, 1993 through Metal Blade Records. The album also featured a guest appearance by Metallica drummer Lars Ulrich (a fellow Dane) on the track "Return of the Vampire". For the album's supporting tour, Morten Nielsen was replaced by King Diamond drummer Snowy Shaw, due to a knee injury Nielsen had sustained. Bassist Timi Hansen was also replaced by Sharlee D'Angelo, as Hansen did not want to take part in touring. On June 27, 1994, the band released The Bell Witch, an EP of live tracks, as well as studio recordings from In the Shadows.

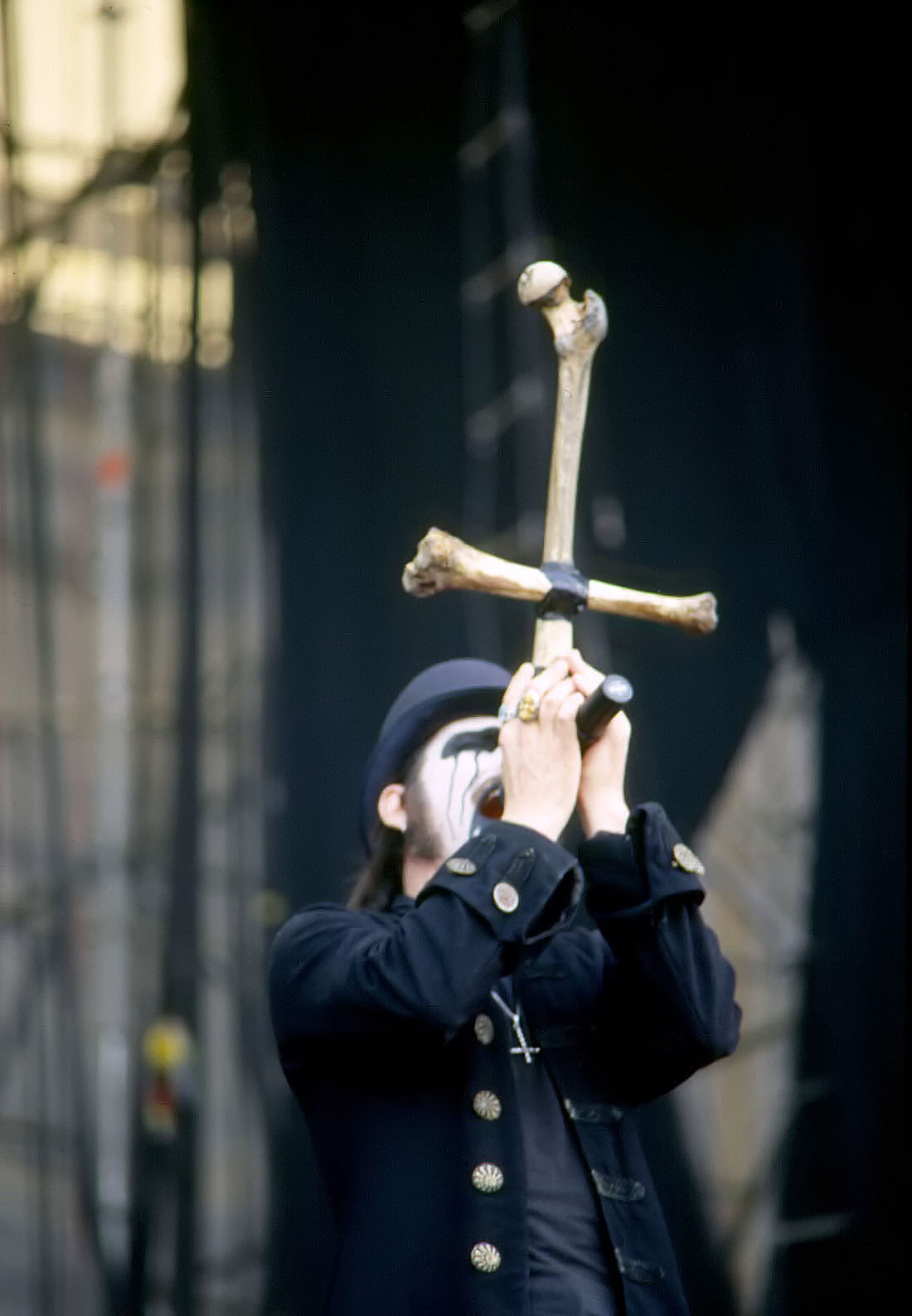
King Diamond performing with Mercyful Fate in 1999

On October 25, 1994, Mercyful Fate released its fourth album Time, which was recorded and mixed at the Dallas Sound Lab during May and August of that year. After the album's release, drummer Snowy Shaw was replaced by Bjarne T. Holm for the Time Tour. Holm had originally been asked to join Mercyful Fate back in 1981, but had declined due to prior commitments. The band spent January through February 1996 recording and mixing their next album Into the Unknown, which was released on August 20, 1996. After the album's release, guitarist Michael Denner left the band and was replaced by Mike Wead. In October 1997, Mercyful Fate began recording its sixth album Dead Again at the Nomad Recording Studio in Carrollton, Texas. Dead Again was released on June 9, 1998. In February 1999, Mercyful Fate began recording its seventh studio album 9, which was released on June 15, 1999.

=== Hiatus and sporadic reunions (1999–2018) ===
After the supporting tour for 9, which included dates in North America, South America and supporting Metallica on a European tour, Mercyful Fate was put on hiatus. King Diamond focused on his eponymous band, along with guitarist Mike Wead, who joined the group during the European House of God tour. Hank Shermann and Bjarne T. Holm reunited with Michael Denner to form Force of Evil, while Sharlee D'Angelo joined the band Arch Enemy. When asked about the current state of the band in 2008, Diamond stated that Mercyful Fate had been "hibernating", and that " they were "definitely not finished, at least in my book." In August 2008, King Diamond was asked by Metallica drummer Lars Ulrich if Mercyful Fate would be willing to participate in Activision's Guitar Hero: Metallica video game. Ulrich requested the original masters for two of the band's songs, so they could be used in the game. Unable to locate them, Diamond suggested to Activision the band re-record the songs, and as a result, King Diamond, Hank Shermann, Michael Denner, Timi Hansen and Bjarne T. Holm reunited to re-record the songs "Evil" and "Curse of the Pharaohs". King Diamond was also made into a playable character in the game.

On December 7, 2011, King Diamond, Hank Shermann, Michael Denner and Timi Hansen reunited onstage at Metallica's 30th Anniversary concert at the Fillmore in San Francisco, California, where they, alongside Metallica, performed the latter's "Mercyful Fate" medley from Garage Inc.

On January 28, 2017, the original line-up of Mercyful Fate (minus Diamond) reunited to receive the Pioneer Prize at the Steppeulven ceremony by the Danish Association of Music Critics at the Bremen Teater in Copenhagen. This was the first time that drummer Kim Ruzz appeared with the band since the 1985 split.

=== Full-time reunion (2019–present) ===
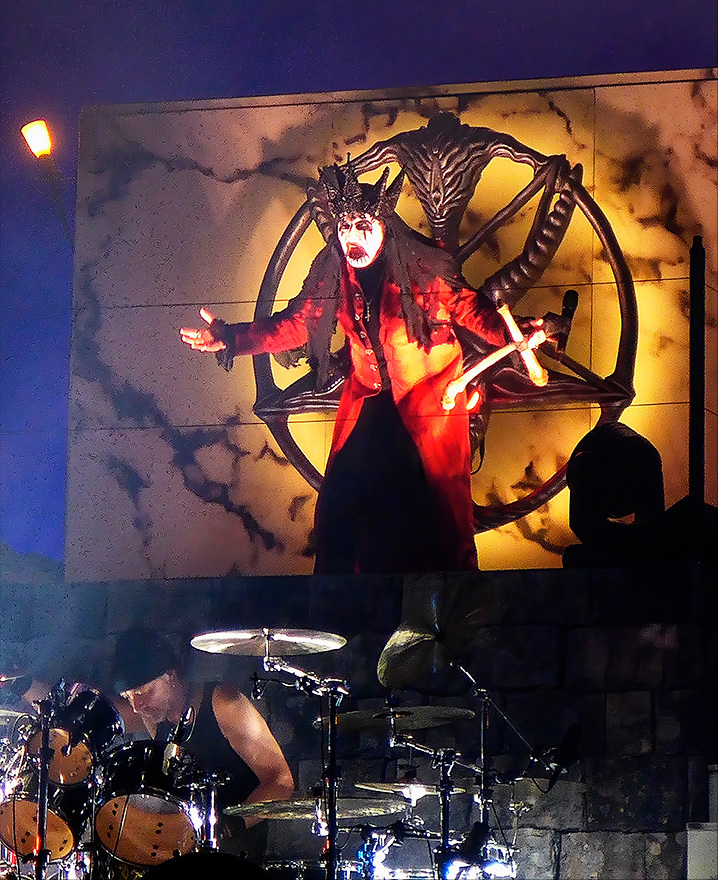
Mercyful Fate performing in 2022

On August 1, 2019, it was announced that Mercyful Fate would be performing an unspecified number of concerts throughout Europe in the summer of 2020. The band's line-up consists of King Diamond on vocals, Hank Shermann on guitar, Bjarne T. Holm on drums, Mike Wead on guitar and Joey Vera on bass, the latter of whom was filling in for Timi Hansen, who was battling cancer; Vera then became their full-time bass player after Hansen died on November 4, 2019, shortly after his 61st birthday. Aside from previously released material, the band was also going to perform new songs over the course of the summer.

In a May 2020 interview with Heavy magazine, Shermann said that he had "written six or seven songs" for the band's new album. On June 2, 2022, Mercyful Fate performed their first live show since 1999 in Hanover as part of a European tour, where they debuted a brand new song titled "The Jackal of Salzburg". In the fall of that year, they embarked on their first North American tour in two decades supported by Kreator and Midnight.

On January 16, 2024, Mercyful Fate announced that they had "mutually decided to split ways" with Vera. Three days later, it was announced Becky Baldwin was the new bassist of the band, who filled in for Vera during the band's 2022 tour. In the following month, Baldwin stated that the new Mercyful Fate album was not expected to be released before 2025, due to King Diamond's focus on his namesake band's upcoming thirteenth studio album Saint Lucifer's Hospital 1920 (formerly titled The Institute).

Mercyful Fate is set to play their first shows in three years in the summer of 2027 at Spain's Leyendas Del Rock and the UK's Bloodstock festivals, and King Diamond has hinted that their new album will be released to coincide with those dates.

== Artistry ==
=== Musical style ===
Mercyful Fate was a part of the first wave of black metal, along with other groups, such as Venom, Bathory, and Hellhammer. Many of these groups helped establish the style upon which future black metal artists would later build. Unlike the other first-wave bands, typical elements of Mercyful Fate's style are influences from progressive rock, epic 1970s hard rock, and traditional heavy metal. As many of the band's songs featured lyrics about Satanism and the occult and King Diamond was among the first black metal musicians to use the now famous corpse paint, Mercyful Fate was a pioneer in developing black metal, although their musical style was not as much an influence as that of other first wave bands.

According to Jeff Kitts of Guitar World, "Mercyful Fate, along with Venom, set the parameters for black metal in the early eighties", and he claimed that the band's self-titled EP and their first two albums, Melissa and Don't Break the Oath, all "established a heavy, Sabbath-influenced sound topped with the schizophrenic vocals of the goulishly made-up King Diamond, whose lyrics were more explicitly Satanic than anything that had come before."

=== Legacy ===
Regarded as one of the pioneers of extreme metal, Mercyful Fate has been cited as influential to genres including black metal, death metal, and thrash metal. They have been cited as an influence on or inspiration to bands of the then-emerging death metal genre, including Death, Morbid Angel, Obituary, Carcass, Cannibal Corpse, and Incantation.

Mercyful Fate have been cited as a formative influence on the 1980s thrash metal scene, including three of the genre's "Big Four" – Metallica, Megadeth, and Slayer – and other bands such as Testament, Exodus, Kreator, Destruction, Sodom, Arch Enemy, Sepultura, and Artillery, as well as groove-oriented metal bands like Pantera and Machine Head. Slayer guitarist Kerry King has stated that he and then-guitarist Jeff Hanneman were big fans of Mercyful Fate and cited them as influence on their second album Hell Awaits. Metallica recorded a medley of Mercyful Fate songs on their 1998 covers album Garage Inc., and since then, the band has performed the song various times live with several members of Mercyful Fate. Lars Ulrich from Metallica has said in about 2008: "Mercyful Fate has made two of the best heavy rock records ever. We have been friends with them for 23 years. The first time I ever played on some other record was with them – I was in Dallas to make Return of the Vampire in 1992. They have been a very, very big inspiration for our sound." Gary Holt of Exodus and Slayer recalls, "We were all listening to the early Mercyful Fate demos. I was like, 'Who's this fuckin dude reciting the Lord's Prayer backwards? He's awesome.' [...] All that stuff had a huge influence on us in the beginning."

Mandy Scythe of MetalSucks stated that the band's debut album Mellissa "changed the face of metal forever, paving the way for the future of black metal, death metal, and even heavy prog. But it did so in an insidious, not-so-obvious way."

== Band members ==
Current line-up

- King Diamond – lead vocals, keyboards (1981–1985, 1992–1999, 2008, 2011, 2019–present)
- Hank Shermann – guitars (1981–1985, 1992–1999, 2008, 2011, 2019–present)
- Bjarne T. Holm – drums (1994–1999, 2008, 2019–present)
- Mike Wead – guitars (1996–1999, 2019–present)
- Becky Baldwin – bass (2024–present; touring 2022)

Former members

- Timi Hansen – bass (1981–1985, 1992–1993, 2008, 2011, 2019; died 2019)
- Carsten Van Der Volsing – guitars (1981)
- Ole Beich – bass (1981; died 1991)
- Ole Frausing – drums (1981)
- Jan Lindblad – drums (1981)
- Nick Smith – drums (1981)
- Kim Ruzz – drums (1981–1985)
- Benny Petersen – guitars (1981–1982)
- Michael Denner – guitars (1982–1985, 1992–1996, 2008, 2011)
- Sharlee D'Angelo – bass (1993–1999)
- Morten Nielsen – drums (1992–1993)
- Snowy Shaw – drums (1993–1994)
- Joey Vera – bass (2019–2024)

== Discography ==
- Melissa (1983)
- Don't Break the Oath (1984)
- In the Shadows (1993)
- Time (1994)
- Into the Unknown (1996)
- Dead Again (1998)
- 9 (1999)
