= Melissa (Mercyful Fate album) =

Studio album by Mercyful Fate
- Released: October 1983
- Recorded: 18–29 July 1983
- Studio: Easy Sound (Copenhagen)
- Genre: Heavy metal
- Length: 40:09
- Label: Roadrunner
- Producer: Henrik Lund

Mercyful Fate chronology
Mercyful Fate (1982)	Melissa (1983)	Don't Break the Oath (1984)

Singles from Melissa
- 1. "Black Funeral" / "Black Masses" Released: 16 December 1983

Melissa is the debut studio album by Danish heavy metal band Mercyful Fate, released in October 1983 through Roadrunner Records. It was the first album released by Roadrunner Records. This was also the first Mercyful Fate effort to get an official release in the United States through Megaforce Records, as their self-titled EP was a highly sought after import, and the BBC sessions were only available on bootleg tapes.

Although Mercyful Fate is often identified as one of the key bands in the first wave of black metal, Melissa's sound is more akin to the new wave of British heavy metal (NWOBHM), while the album also featured elements of what would later become black metal, death metal, thrash metal and progressive metal. Melissa has also been recognised as one of the first extreme metal albums, and was highly influential to the mid-to-late 1980s and early 1990s metal scenes. Music is credited to Hank Shermann and lyrics to King Diamond.

== Background ==
Emerging from the ashes of the punk band Brats, Mercyful Fate was formed in the spring of 1981 by vocalist King Diamond and guitarists Hank Shermann and Michael Denner. The band formed in response to their record label, CBS' demands for more commercial music. After several demos, the band would release their self-titled EP.

== Recording ==
On 18 July 1983, Mercyful Fate started recording at Easy Sounds Studios in Copenhagen with producer Henrik Lund, who was the co-owner of the studio along with his brother. The band spent 12 days in the studio to record and mix the album. The songs had been thoroughly arranged and rehearsed in advance to make the most of the limited time. Lund, who had never produced a metal band before, mixed the album on his own, but accepted comments from the musicians on his different takes. The band found this procedure very irritating but, in retrospect, Diamond understands "that he didn't want a bunch of amateurs hanging over his shoulder." At that time, the label asked the band to do a cover song, so the band recorded Led Zeppelin's "Immigrant Song". The band skipped it because they felt it did not fit very well with the lyrics and feel of the album. According to Shermann, Diamond's performance was very surprising, because he sounded very close to Robert Plant's original vocals.

== Content and music ==
Some of the material on the album had its roots in demos recorded when the musicians were members of the underground bands Black Rose and Brats: "Curse of the Pharaohs", which was originally titled "Night Riders" on an old Brats demo, was retitled after King Diamond changed the lyrics originally written by the Brats bassist; "Love Criminals", actually the first song Mercyful Fate ever wrote, was renamed "Into the Coven", which was originally meant to be the title of the album too. The album also contains "Satan's Fall" which, as Michael Denner recalls, took ages to learn and elicited an eerie feeling the few times he heard it. Hank Shermann wrote the music for this song, which was composed during many sleepless nights on his unplugged guitar in his living room. The band kept rehearsing the song for a long time in its unfinished form, as Shermann continuously added new parts. According to Denner, there are about sixteen different riffs in "Satan's Fall", which was the band's longest song with a running time over 11 minutes, until the band released Dead Again, on which the title track is 13 minutes long.

Melissa has been cited as "one of the first records to start to develop an 'extreme metal' sound", and Justin Wearn of This Day in Metal noted that, "With dark lyrics, guitar solos prevalent throughout the record, fast paced and double bass drums throughout, and satanic imagery in the visuals, it was an inspiration and influenced many popular metal bands like Metallica, Exodus, Slayer and countless others. With elements of thrash metal, musical traits you would hear in black metal and death metal along with progressive metal, Melissa was a groundbreaker in heavy metal history for multiple reasons."

== Release ==
The album was released in October 1983. On 16 December 1983, the "Black Funeral" single was released through Music For Nations label, It contained on the B-side the song "Black Masses", which was recorded during the Melissa sessions, but had been deleted from the album. It was the first song recorded in the initial session and the sound was not completely satisfying, so the track was reduced to a B-side only. In 2005, Roadrunner Records re-released the album with several bonus tracks and a bonus DVD.

== Touring ==
On 3 December 1983, Mercyful Fate were booked to support Ozzy Osbourne in Copenhagen, but due to an illness on Osbourne's part, the show was canceled. Later that same month, the band performed a headline show in Copenhagen as preparation for their upcoming European tour.

The European tour started in the Netherlands on 19 January 1984 at The Dynamo, in Eindhoven. The next day, they performed a set at The Countdown Cafe in Hilversum, which was broadcast live on Dutch national radio. On 21 January, they performed in Amsterdam, at The Paradiso Theatre, where the skull of Melissa was stolen from the altar on stage by a fan due to very incompetent local security. Then the band went touring Italy on February, where they performed 6 shows, and on the following 3 March, they started their UK tour supporting Manowar. Originally, 11 shows were booked, but it turned out that Mercyful Fate would only play one. That first and only show took place at St. Albans City Hall in Hertfordshire, where the main act crew did not leave Mercyful Fate time for a sound check or to properly set up their equipment. Manowar's sound engineer even tampered with Mercyful Fate's soundboard during their performance, which was reduced from 45 minutes to 25. Manowar refused to comply with Mercyful Fate and Roadrunner's request for better treatment, which forced the band to leave the tour with great financial loss to themselves, not to mention disappointment of their British fans.

On 5 April, the band played a sold-out headline show at Saltlageret, in Copenhagen. There, for the first time, they were able to present their new chapel stage set. Then on 30 April, they began to work on the next release for the next 19 days, once again at Easy Sounds Studios. On 10 June, the band performed at the prestigious Heavy Sound Festival in Poperinge, Belgium. Beside Mercyful Fate, the bill also featured Motörhead, Twisted Sister, Metallica, Barón Rojo, Lita Ford, H-Bomb and Faithful Breath.

Additionally, Mercyful Fate met the members of Metallica on tour in 1984, whom they've stayed very good friends with since then. It all began when Metallica, while recording in Copenhagen, borrowed amplifiers from Mercyful Fate and various other equipment. Metallica covered a medley of songs from Melissa on their 1998 cover album Garage Inc.

A re-recorded version of "Evil" is featured in the video game Guitar Hero: Metallica.

== Reception ==
Professional ratings
Review scores
Source	Rating
AllMusic	4/5 stars
Collector's Guide to Heavy Metal	9/10
Metal Forces	9/10

The album has received acclaim since its release. Writing for Allmusic, Steve Huey would write, "Mercyful Fate's debut album, Melissa, took Black Sabbath's dark occult obsessions to an extreme, fusing them with the speed and tightened, twin-guitar riffing attack of British metal bands like Judas Priest and Iron Maiden," concluding, "The band was still finding itself, and some of the songs on Melissa have a tendency to move into long, meandering instrumental sections, but the basic components of Mercyful Fate's influential European gothic black metal sound were already in place."

=== Controversy ===
In 1985, advocating the need for Parental Advisory labels on audio recordings, the Parents Music Resource Center cited "Into the Coven" among their Filthy Fifteen objectionable songs due to its perceived occult content.

== Legacy ==
Melissa has been identified as one of the earliest and most seminal examples of extreme metal, and is often considered to be a major influence on the then-developing thrash metal, black metal and death metal genres.

In 2011, Melissa became the 74th album to be inducted into the Decibel Hall of Fame; the publication originally wanted to induct the album back in 2005, but could not conduct interviews with Michael Denner and Kim Ruzz until late 2010.

In 2017, Rolling Stone ranked Melissa as 17th on their list of "The 100 Greatest Metal Albums of All Time". Kerry King of Slayer cited the album as one of his favorite heavy metal albums of all time, saying, "It has great songwriting. I love the guitar duo of Michael Denner and Hank Shermann. And King Diamond has a completely unique style of singing and you either love it or hate it. Anybody would have a hard time finding fault in Melissa. It's just really well done." He further added, "There was definitely a Mercyful Fate influence on [Slayer's] Hell Awaits. You can tell by the super long songs with, like, 10,000 riff changes. That was definitely a Mercyful Fate influence."

Mandy Scythe of MetalSucks stated that the album "changed the face of metal forever, paving the way for the future of black metal, death metal, and even heavy prog. But it did so in an insidious, not-so-obvious way." Adding that Mellisa "showcased how slow, intentional music with an almost operatic quality could still be crushing and heavy as hell."

== Track listing ==
All lyrics are written by King Diamond; all music is composed by Hank Shermann.

Side one
No.	Title	Length
1.	"Evil"	4:45
2.	"Curse of the Pharaohs"	3:57
3.	"Into the Coven"	5:11
4.	"At the Sound of the Demon Bell"	5:23

Side two
No.	Title	Length
5.	"Black Funeral"	2:50
6.	"Satan's Fall"	11:23
7.	"Melissa"	6:40

25th Anniversary edition bonus tracks
No.	Title	Length
8.	"Black Masses" (Outtake)	4:31
9.	"Curse of the Pharaohs" (BBC Radio 1 Session)	3:52
10.	"Evil" (BBC Radio 1 Session)	4:02
11.	"Satan's Fall" (BBC Radio 1 Session)	10:29
12.	"Curse of the Pharaohs" (Demo)	4:26
13.	"Black Funeral" (Demo)	2:54

=== 25th anniversary edition DVD track listing ===
Live at Dynamo, Eindhoven, Holland 1983

1. "Doomed by the Living Dead"
2. "Black Funeral"
3. "Curse of the Pharaohs"

== Personnel ==
Mercyful Fate

- King Diamond – vocals
- Hank Shermann – guitars
- Michael Denner – guitars (tracks 1–11)
- Timi Hansen – bass
- Kim Ruzz – drums

Additional performers

- Benny Petersen – guitars (tracks 12–13)

Production

- Produced by Henrik Lund
- Engineered by Jacob J. Jorgensen
- Mixed by Henrik Lund and Mercyful Fate
- Tracks 9–11 produced and mixed by Tony Wilson and engineered by David Dade
- Tracks 12–13 produced by Mercyful Fate
- Cover art by Thomas Holm / Studio Dzyan
- Photography by Thomas Grondahl

2005 reissue

- Produced for reissue by Tom Burleigh and Monte Conner, assisted by Steven Hartong
- Remastered by Ted Jensen
- Liner notes written by Don Kaye
- Art direction by Mr. Scott Design
- Additional photography by Kevin Estrada
- DVD authoring by James Moore / Moore Imagination

== Charts ==
Chart performance for Melissa
Chart (2020)	Peak position
German Albums (Offizielle Top 100)	69
