= Dead Again (Mercyful Fate album) =

- Cover art by Kristian Wåhlin

Studio album by Mercyful Fate
- Released: 9 June 1998
- Recorded: October–November 1997
- Studio: Nomad Recording Studio, Carrollton, Texas, U.S.
- Genre: Heavy metal
- Length: 58:45
- Label: Metal Blade
- Producer: Sterling Winfield and Mercyful Fate

Mercyful Fate chronology
Into the Unknown (1996)	Dead Again (1998)	9 (1999)

Professional ratings
Review scores
Source	Rating
AllMusic	3/5 stars
Collector's Guide to Heavy Metal	8/10
Rock Hard	8.5/10

Dead Again is the sixth studio album by Danish heavy metal band Mercyful Fate, released on 9 June 1998 through Metal Blade Records. It marks the first album from Mercyful Fate that Michael Denner is not present on. It also marked a new era for the band, as the production is more muddy and raw, and the guitar tone is more distorted than on the three previous albums. In addition, the album introduced a more complex and arguably progressive sound to several of its tracks.

== Track listing ==
All lyrics are written by King Diamond.

No.	Title	Music	Length
1.	"Torture (1629)"	Hank Shermann	5:03
2.	"The Night"	Shermann	5:51
3.	"Since Forever"	Diamond	4:39
4.	"The Lady Who Cries"	Diamond	4:18
5.	"Banshee"	Diamond	4:47
6.	"Mandrake"	Shermann	6:06
7.	"Sucking your Blood"	Diamond	4:22
8.	"Dead Again"	Shermann	13:41
9.	"Fear"	Diamond	4:16
10.	"Crossroads"	Sharlee D'Angelo	5:42

== Personnel ==
Mercyful Fate

- King Diamond – vocals
- Hank Shermann – guitars
- Mike Wead – guitars
- Sharlee D'Angelo – bass
- Bjarne T. Holm – drums

Production

- King Diamond – mixing, mastering
- Sterling Winfield – production, engineering, mixing
- Kol Marshall – engineering
- Chris Estes – assistant engineering
