= Cruisin' for a Bruisin' (Fate album) =

Studio album by Fate
- Released: November 1988
- Recorded: Recorded at Puk Studios, Sweet Silence Studios and Hookfarm Studios, Denmark
- Genres: Hard rock, AOR, glam metal
- Length: 39:18
- Label: EMI
- Producers: Fate and Simon Hanhart

Fate chronology
A Matter of Attitude (1986)	Cruisin' for a Bruisin' (1988)	Scratch 'n' Sniff (1990)

Singles from Cruisin' for a Bruisin
- 1. "Lovers" Released: 1988; 2. "Babe, You Got a Friend" Released: 1989

Professional ratings
Review scores
Source	Rating
Kerrang!	4/5 stars

Cruisin for a Bruisin is the third studio album by Danish rock band Fate, released in 1988. The album featured "Lovers" (released as a single plus video clip in 1988) and a re-recorded version of "Love on the Rox" from the band's debut album. The album was digitally remastered and reissued in 2001.

== Track listing ==
1. "Beneath da Coconuts" – 4:34
2. "Love on the Rox" – 3:35
3. "Knock on Wood" – 2:59
4. "Lovers" – 4:15
5. "Dead Boy, Cold Meat" – 3:26
6. "Babe, You Got a Friend" – 4:44
7. "Lock You Up" – 4:26
8. "Cupid Shot Me" – 3:50
9. "Diamond in the Rough" – 3:52
10. "Send a Little Money" – 3:40

== Personnel ==
Fate

- Jeff "Lox" Limbo – vocals
- The Mysterious Mr. Moth – guitars
- Flemming Rothaus – keyboards
- Pete Steiner – bass
- Bob Lance – drums

Production

- Simon Hanhart – producer
- Peter Mark – engineer, assistant engineer
- Søren Svendsen – photography
