= Mercyful Fate (EP) =

EP by Mercyful Fate
- Released: 8 November 1982
- Recorded: September 1982
- Genre: Heavy metal
- Length: 22:04
- Label: Rave-On Records
- Producer: Jac Hustinx

Mercyful Fate chronology
| Mercyful Fate (1982) | Melissa (1983) |

Professional ratings
Review scores
| Source | Rating |
|---|---|
| AllMusic | 3/5 stars |

Mercyful Fate is the first official release by Danish heavy metal band Mercyful Fate. It is also known as Nuns Have No Fun, the "first album" or the "EP". It is a four track, 45rpm effort and was recorded and mixed at Stone Studio in Roosendaal, Netherlands, in two days in September 1982, and released on the independent label Rave-On Records as RMLP-002 on 8 November 1982. The album was produced and mixed by Jac Hustinx and engineered by Willem Steetjes. The cover is drawn by Ole Poulsen. The album in its entirety was later re-issued in 1987 as part of The Beginning compilation. On 5 June 2020 it was released for the first time officially on CD through Metal Blade Records. Issued in hardcover gatefold sleeve, with black polycarbonate CD.

There are three pressings:

- First pressing is white bordered.
- Second pressing is black bordered.
- Third pressing is black bordered but distributed by Bertus Holland.

== Track listing ==
Side A

1. "A Corpse Without Soul" (Hank Shermann, King Diamond) – 6:53
2. "Nuns Have No Fun" (Shermann, Michael Denner, Diamond) – 4:17

Side B

1. "Doomed by the Living Dead" (Shermann, Diamond) – 5:06
2. "Devil Eyes" (Shermann, Diamond) – 5:48

== Personnel ==
- King Diamond – vocals
- Hank Shermann – guitars
- Michael Denner – guitars
- Timi Hansen – bass
- Kim Ruzz – drums
