= The Bell Witch (EP) =

EP by Mercyful Fate
- Released: 27 June 1994
- Recorded: 8 October 1993 (live tracks)
- Genre: Heavy metal
- Length: 28:56
- Label: Metal Blade
- Producer: King Diamond, Hank Shermann, Tim Kimsey

Mercyful Fate chronology
In the Shadows (1993)	The Bell Witch (1994)	Time (1994)

Professional ratings
Review scores
Source	Rating
AllMusic	2.5/5 stars
Collector's Guide to Heavy Metal	6/10

The Bell Witch is a short, promotional EP released by Danish heavy metal band Mercyful Fate to herald their reunion album. It features two tracks off In the Shadows, of which one is based on the American legend of the Bell Witch, plus four live tracks. The EP was released on 27 June 1994. It was re-released in 2004 on Metal Blade Records.

== Track listing ==
1. "The Bell Witch" (Hank Shermann) (King Diamond) – 4:34
2. "Is that You, Melissa" (King Diamond) – 4:37
3. "Curse of the Pharaohs" (Diamond, Shermann) – 4:24 |¹
4. "Egypt" (Diamond) – 4:53 |¹
5. "Come to the Sabbath" (Diamond) – 6:48 |¹
6. "Black Funeral" (Diamond, Shermann) – 3:40 |¹

|¹ Recorded live 8 October 1993 in Los Angeles, California.

== Personnel ==
- King Diamond – vocals
- Hank Shermann – guitars
- Michael Denner – guitars
- Timi "Grabber" Hansen – bass
- Snowy Shaw – drums (on live tracks only, studio tracks feature Morten Nielsen)
- Sharlee D'Angelo – bass (on live tracks)
