= A Matter of Attitude =

Studio album by Fate
- Released: 1986
- Recorded: Autumn 1986
- Studio: Easy Sound, Copenhagen
- Genre: Hard rock, AOR, glam metal
- Length: 37:58
- Label: EMI (Europe); Capitol (North America)
- Producer: Svein Dag Hauge

Fate chronology
Fate (1985)	A Matter of Attitude (1986)	Cruisin' for a Bruisin' (1988)

Singles from A Matter of Attitude
- 1. "Won't Stop" Released: 1986; 2. "Summerlove" Released: 1987

Professional ratings
Review scores
Source	Rating
AllMusic	3/5 stars
Collector's Guide to Heavy Metal	5/10

A Matter of Attitude is the second album by Danish rock band Fate, released in 1986.

The album was in the hook-filled melodic hard rock/pop metal vein, featuring tight vocal harmonies over a strong rhythm section, guitar, and sweeping synthesizer. Stylistically it was like Europe with a bit more bite. "Won't Stop" was the album's first single, and the track was also released in an extended 12" remix version. The album was almost entirely hard-driving rockers, without the power ballads of many other bands of the genre. Original closer was "Do It", a tongue-in-cheek retro Louis Armstrong-style shuffle of the type David Lee Roth and David Johansen were experimenting with at the time.

After a decade and a half out of print, the album was re-released on CD by independent label MTM Classix in 2004. The re-release includes lyrics and liner notes, including a new thank-you section. The collection ends with two new bonus tracks. The first, "Hardcore Romance", is in a rawer style, sans the keyboards prevalent throughout the original '80s recording. The second, "Memories of You", makes up for the lack of balladry in the original track list, bringing back a subtler wash of keyboards and a subdued guitar.

== Track listing ==
All lyrics by Jeff Limbo, music as indicated

Side one

1. "Won't Stop" (Pete Steiner) – 3:21
2. "Hard as a Rock" (Steiner) – 3:47
3. "I Can't Stand Losing You" (Steiner) – 4:50
4. "Point of No Return" (Steiner, Hank Shermann) – 3:51
5. "The Hunter" (Shermann, Steiner) – 4:16

Side two

6. "Summerlove" (Steiner) – 4:00
7. "Farrah" (Shermann, Steiner) – 3:53
8. "Get Up and Go" (Shermann) – 3:21
9. "Limbo a Go Go" (Steiner) – 4:04
10. "Do It" (Limbo) – 2:34

2004 CD edition bonus tracks

11. "Hardcore Romance"
12. "Memories of You"

== Personnel ==
Fate

- Jeff "Lox" Limbo – vocals
- Hank Shermann – guitar
- Pete Steiner – bass, keyboards
- Bob Lance – drums

Additional musicians

- Kjetil Bjerkestrand – additional keyboards
- Svein Dag Hauge – additional guitar
- Egil Eldøen, Frank Ådahl, Lis Dam – backing vocals

Production

- Svein Dag Hauge – producer
- Sverre Erik Henriksen – engineer
- Kim Petersen, Morten Henningsen – assistant engineers
