= Don't Break the Oath =

Studio album by Mercyful Fate
- Released: 7 September 1984
- Recorded: May 1984
- Studios: Easy Sound Recording, Copenhagen, Denmark
- Genre: Heavy metal
- Length: 47:30
- Label: Roadrunner
- Producer: Henrik Lund

Mercyful Fate chronology
Melissa (1983)	Don't Break the Oath (1984)	The Beginning (1987)

Professional ratings
Review scores
Source	Rating
AllMusic	4.5/5 stars
Collector's Guide to Heavy Metal	10/10

Don't Break the Oath is the second studio album by Danish heavy metal band Mercyful Fate, released on 7 September 1984 through Roadrunner Records. It was the last Mercyful Fate album to include Kim Ruzz on drums, who was replaced by Morten Nielsen when the band reunited.

The album was remastered and subsequently re-issued on Roadrunner Records in 1997. This reissue came with the bonus track "Death Kiss (Demo)", which would eventually evolve into the album's lead-off track, "A Dangerous Meeting".

== Music and lyrics ==
The style Mercyful Fate employed on Don't Break the Oath resembled a mixture of heavy metal with progressive elements, lyrically preoccupied with Satan and the occult and distinguished by King Diamond's theatrical falsetto vocals. Very influential to future black metal bands due to its lyrical content, the music itself tends toward progressive forms such as dramatic modulations, tempo and tone changes.

According to Louis Pattison of Pitchfork: "On Don’t Break the Oath, the Copenhagen quintet were drawing power from the rollicking tempos of hard rock, the neo-classical techniques of prog, and the brutish heaviness of UK standard bearers Venom. Then, on top of that, they threw in King Diamond, a genuine Satanist whose operatic vocals dripped with evil grandeur, but who was also capable of a pathos-laden wail curiously reminiscent of the Cure’s Robert Smith."

The song title "Welcome Princess of Hell" is a misprint appearing on some editions of the album; the title was originally meant to be "Welcome Princes of Hell".

== Legacy ==
The album received critical acclaim, and Metal Rules named this the greatest extreme metal album of all time. Louis Pattison of Pitchfork wrote: "Thanks to Diamond’s distinctive corpse paint, Mercyful Fate are often pigeonholed as a sort of proto-black metal band. But ultimately, Don’t Break the Oath isn’t great because it’s a roadmap to some future sound; this is ’80s metal in excelsis."

== Track listing ==
All lyrics are written by King Diamond.

Side one
No.	Title	Music	Length
1.	"A Dangerous Meeting"	Hank Shermann	5:10
2.	"Nightmare"	Shermann	6:20
3.	"Desecration of Souls"	Shermann; Michael Denner	4:54
4.	"Night of the Unborn"	Shermann	4:59

Side two
No.	Title	Music	Length
5.	"The Oath"	Diamond	7:31
6.	"Gypsy"	Denner; Diamond	3:08
7.	"Welcome Princess of Hell"	Shermann	4:03
8.	"To One Far Away"	Denner; Diamond	1:31
9.	"Come to the Sabbath"	Diamond	5:19

1997 re-release bonus track
No.	Title	Length
10.	"Death Kiss" (demo)	4:30

== Personnel ==
Mercyful Fate

- King Diamond - vocals, keyboards, harpsichord
- Hank Shermann - guitars
- Michael Denner - guitars
- Timi Hansen - bass
- Kim Ruzz - drums
- Benny Petersen - guitar (on track 10)

Production

- Henrik Lund - producer, engineer
- Niels Erik Otto - engineer
- Thomas Holm - cover art

== Charts ==
Chart performance for Don't Break the Oath
Chart (2020)	Peak position
German Albums (Offizielle Top 100)	66
