= The Beginning (Mercyful Fate album) =

Compilation album by Mercyful Fate
- Released: 24 June 1987
- Genre: Heavy metal
- Length: 44:53
- Label: Roadrunner
- Producer: Jac Hustinx, Henrik Lund, Tony Wilson

Mercyful Fate chronology
| Don't Break the Oath (1984) | The Beginning (1987) | Return of the Vampire (1992) |

Professional ratings
Review scores
| Source | Rating |
|---|---|
| AllMusic | 2.5/5 stars |
| Collector's Guide to Heavy Metal | 8/10 |

The Beginning is a compilation album by Danish heavy metal band Mercyful Fate released on 24 June 1987 through Roadrunner Records consisting of the Nuns Have No Fun EP and different versions of 4 tracks from the album Melissa.

== Track listing ==
1. "Doomed by the Living Dead" – 5:07
2. "A Corpse Without Soul" – 6:52
3. "Nuns Have No Fun" – 4:17
4. "Devil Eyes" – 5:48
5. "Curse of the Pharaohs" – 3:50 ¹
6. "Evil" – 4:01 ¹
7. "Satan's Fall" – 10:28 ¹
8. "Black Masses" – 4:30 ²
9. "Black Funeral" – 2:52 ³

¹ From the Friday Rock Show, 19 March 1983
² From the "Black Funeral" single (B-side)
³ From the Metallic Storm compilation (remaster only)
