= Into the Unknown (Mercyful Fate album) =

Studio album by Mercyful Fate
- Released: 20 August 1996
- Recorded: January–February 1996
- Studio: Dallas Sound Lab, Dallas, Texas, US
- Genre: Heavy metal
- Length: 44:38
- Label: Metal Blade
- Producer: King Diamond, Tim Kimsey, Brian Slagel

Mercyful Fate chronology
Time (1994)	Into the Unknown (1996)	Dead Again (1998)

Professional ratings
Review scores
Source	Rating
AllMusic	3/5 stars
Chronicles of Chaos	5/10
Collector's Guide to Heavy Metal	9/10
Rock Hard	9.5/10

Into the Unknown is the fifth album by Danish heavy metal band Mercyful Fate, released on 20 August 1996 through Metal Blade Records. It is the most commercially successful Mercyful Fate album to date, peaking at No. 31 in the Finnish charts and remaining for two weeks in the Top 40. It is the only album by the band to appear on the charts.

== Track listing ==
All lyrics are written by King Diamond.

No.	Title	Music	Length
1.	"Lucifer"	Diamond	1:31
2.	"The Uninvited Guest"	Diamond	4:16
3.	"The Ghost of Change"	Diamond	5:43
4.	"Listen to the Bell"	Hank Shermann	3:58
5.	"Fifteen Men (And a Bottle of Rum)"	Michael Denner	5:06
6.	"Into the Unknown"	Shermann	6:36
7.	"Under the Spell"	Diamond	4:43
8.	"Deadtime"	Denner	3:16
9.	"Holy Water"	Diamond	4:33
10.	"Kutulu (The Mad Arab, Part 2)"	Shermann	5:19

Japanese release bonus track
No.	Title	Writer(s)	Length
11.	"The Ripper" (Judas Priest cover)	Glenn Tipton	2:53

== Personnel ==
Mercyful Fate

- King Diamond – vocals, keyboards
- Hank Shermann – guitars
- Michael Denner – guitars
- Sharlee D'Angelo – bass
- Bjarne T. Holm – drums

Production

- King Diamond – production, mixing
- Hank Shermann – mixing
- Tim Kimsey – production, engineering, mixing
- Troy Scheer – assistant engineering
- Howie Weinberg – mastering at Masterdisk, New York
- Brian Slagel – executive production
