= Tim Kimsey =

- Origin: Weatherford, Texas, United States
- Occupation(s): Engineer, Producer
- Years active: 1980s-present

Tim Kimsey is a multi-platinum mixing engineer and audio engineer.

== Grammy Award Nomination ==
Kimsey was nominated, alongside fellow engineers Gerald Baillergeau, Chris Bell, Kevin Bond, "Bassy" Bob Brockmann, Mick Guzauski, Fred Hammond, Ray Hammond, Victor “Vinno” Merritt and Mark Williams, for Grammy Award for Best Engineered Album, Non-Classical for Kirk Franklin's 1998 Best Contemporary R&B Gospel Album, The Nu Nation Project.

== Selected discography ==
Year	Title	Artist	Credit
2006	Wait EP	The Polyphonic Spree	Mixing
1998	The Nu Nation Project	Kirk Franklin	Engineer, Mixing, Remixing
1997	Concede	Sister Hazel	Mixing
1994	Far Beyond Driven	Pantera	Mixing Assistant
1994	Time	Mercyful Fate	Engineer, Mixing, Producer
1994	For the Love of Strange Medicine	Steve Perry	Engineer
1994	Super Tight...	UGK	Engineer, Mixing
1990	To The Extreme	Vanilla Ice	Engineer
