= Time (Mercyful Fate album) =

Studio album by Mercyful Fate
- Released: 25 October 1994
- Recorded: May–August 1994
- Studio: Dallas Sound Lab, Dallas, Texas, U.S.
- Genre: Heavy metal
- Length: 47:00
- Label: Metal Blade
- Producer: King Diamond, Tim Kimsey and Hank Shermann

Mercyful Fate chronology
| The Bell Witch EP (1994) | Time (1994) | Into the Unknown (1996) |

Professional ratings
Review scores
| Source | Rating |
|---|---|
| AllMusic | 4/5 stars |
| Collector's Guide to Heavy Metal | 8/10 |
| Rock Hard (GER) | 9.0/10 |

Time is the fourth studio album by the Danish heavy metal band Mercyful Fate. It was released on 25 October 1994 through Metal Blade Records.

The track "The Mad Arab" is about H. P. Lovecraft's character Abdul Alhazred, the author of the fictional forbidden tome of occult lore The Necronomicon. In the lyric booklet, it is subtitled "Part One: The Vision". The second part appears as the track "Kutulu (The Mad Arab, Part Two)" on the follow-up, Into the Unknown.

== Track listing ==
All lyrics are written by King Diamond.

| No. | Title | Music | Length |
|---|---|---|---|
| 1. | "Nightmare Be Thy Name" | Michael Denner | 3:29 |
| 2. | "Angel of Light" | Diamond | 3:37 |
| 3. | "Witches' Dance" | Diamond | 4:47 |
| 4. | "The Mad Arab" | Hank Shermann | 4:42 |
| 5. | "My Demon" | Diamond | 4:42 |
| 6. | "Time" | Diamond | 4:22 |
| 7. | "The Preacher" | Shermann | 3:29 |
| 8. | "Lady in Black" | Diamond | 3:49 |
| 9. | "Mirror" | Denner | 3:19 |
| 10. | "The Afterlife" | Shermann | 4:32 |
| 11. | "Castillo del Mortes" | Shermann | 6:14 |

== Personnel ==
Mercyful Fate

- King Diamond – vocals, keyboards, harpsichord
- Hank Shermann – guitars
- Michael Denner – guitars
- Sharlee D'Angelo – bass
- Snowy Shaw – drums

Production

- King Diamond – production, mixing
- Hank Shermann – associate production, mixing
- Tim Kimsey – production, engineering, mixing
- Kevin Wade – assistant engineering
- Frank Salazar – pre-mastering
- Eddy Schreyer – mastering at Future Disc, Los Angeles
