= Tom Coyne (music engineer) =

American mastering engineer (1954–2017)

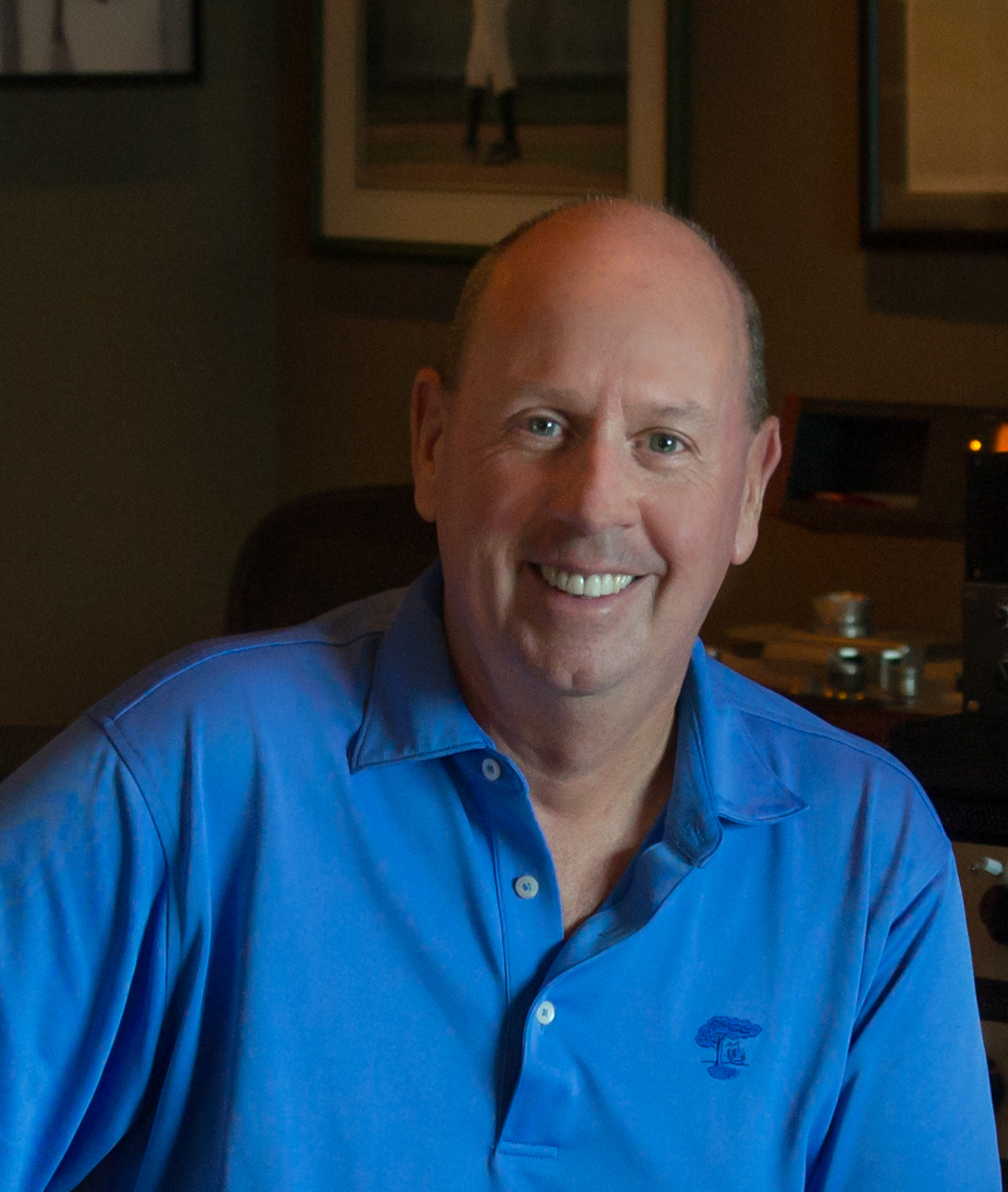
- Coyne at Sterling Sound in 2014

Background information
- Born: Thomas J. Coyne; April 23, 1954; Elizabeth, New Jersey, U.S.
- Died: April 12, 2017 (aged 62) U.S.
- Occupation: Mastering engineer
- Website: tomcoyne.sterlingsound.com

Thomas J. Coyne (April 23, 1954 – April 12, 2017) was an American mastering engineer.

== Early life and education ==
Coyne was born in Elizabeth, New Jersey, and grew up in nearby Union, where he graduated from Roselle Catholic High School in 1972.

He attended Kean College where he received a degree in Commercial Design.

== Career ==
Following college, Coyne's first job was at Dick Charles Recording where Lee Hulko, former owner of Sterling Sound, got his first job in the states after arriving from Thunder Bay, Ontario. In the six months Coyne worked at Dick Charles, he watched Dick master records on the lathe and soon began cutting his own after hours. Coyne then was hired at Frankford/Wayne Mastering Labs, assisting under Dominic Romeo, known for cutting 45s for The Rolling Stones, The Four Seasons, Frankie Valli, Dionne Warwick, and others.

Over the following decade, Coyne primarily cut records for dance bands with his first big record being "Ladies Night" by Kool & the Gang. In 1989, Coyne was hired by The Hit Factory where he spent another five years mastering mostly Hip-Hop and R&B records by artists such as Billy Ocean, A Tribe Called Quest and De La Soul. In 1994, Coyne was offered a job by Lee Hulko who now operated Sterling Sound. In 1998, Coyne, Ted Jensen, Greg Calbi, Murat Aktar (Absolute Audio co-founder), and UK-based Metropolis bought Sterling Sound from Lee Hulko.

== Death ==
Coyne died on April 12, 2017, from multiple myeloma at the age of 62.

== Awards and recognition ==
During his career, Coyne won ten Grammy Awards and one Latin Grammy Award and was nominated in 35 categories.

=== Grammy Awards ===
Year	Nominee / work	Award	Result
2010	I Am... Sasha Fierce	Album of the Year	Nominated
2012	21	Album of the Year	Won
2013	"We Are Never Ever Getting Back Together"	Record of the Year	Nominated
2014	The Heist	Album of the Year	Nominated
2014	Red	Album of the Year	Nominated
2015	Beyoncé	Album of the Year	Nominated
2015	In the Lonely Hour	Album of the Year	Nominated
2015	"Stay with Me (Darkchild Version)"	Record of the Year	Won
2015	"Shake It Off"	Record of the Year	Nominated
2016	"Uptown Funk"	Record of the Year	Won
2016	"Blank Space"	Record of the Year	Nominated
2016	"Can't Feel My Face"	Record of the Year	Nominated
2016	1989	Album of the Year	Won
2016	Beauty Behind the Madness	Album of the Year	Nominated
2017	25	Album of the Year	Won
2017	Purpose	Album of the Year	Nominated
2017	"Hello"	Record of the Year	Won
2017	"7 Years"	Record of the Year	Nominated
2018	"24K Magic"	Record of the Year	Won
2018	24K Magic	Album of the Year	Won
2018	24K Magic	Best Engineered Album, Non-Classical	Won
2019	Colors	Best Engineered Album, Non-Classical	Won

=== Latin Grammy Awards ===
Year	Nominee / work	Award	Result
2009	Ciclos	Album of the Year	Nominated
2012	Independiente	Album of the Year	Nominated
2012	Déjenme Llorar	Album of the Year	Nominated
2013	Corazón Profundo	Album of the Year	Nominated
2013	"Vivir Mi Vida"	Record of the Year	Won
2014	3.0	Album of the Year	Nominated
2014	Más Corazón Profundo	Album of the Year	Nominated
2015	Creo en Mí	Album of the Year	Nominated
2015	Sirope	Album of the Year	Nominated
2016	Conexión	Album of the Year	Nominated
2016	"Duele el Corazón"	Record of the Year	Nominated

== Studio ==
Sterling Sound is located in New York City, occupying the top floor of the Chelsea Market in the Meatpacking District. It was designed by Fran Manzella, FM Design.

== List of works mastered by Tom Coyne ==
=== 1970s ===
- 1979 – Music Box Dancer – Frank Mills
- 1979 – Delores Hall – Delores Hall
- 1979 – I'm Caught Up (In a One Night Love Affair) – Inner Life
- 1979 – Come Into My Life – Carol Douglas
- 1979 – Ladies' Night – Kool & the Gang
- 1978 – What About You! – Stanley Turrentine
- 1978 – Take a Look at Those Cakes – James Brown

=== 1980s ===
- 1989 – Beneath the Remains – Sepultura
- 1989 – Bayou Cadillac – BeauSoleil
- 1989 – Flag – Yello
- 1988 – I Remember Blind Joe Death – John Fahey
- 1988 – Life Is...Too Short – Too Short
- 1988 – Staring at the Sun – Level 42
- 1988 – Power Metal – Pantera
- 1987 – Liberty and Justice For... – Agnostic Front
- 1987 – Buster Poindexter – Buster Poindexter
- 1987 – Earth, Sun, Moon – Love and Rockets
- 1987 – Running in the Family – Level 42
- 1987 – Taking Over – Overkill
- 1987 - The Legacy - Testament
- 1986 – Standing in the Light – Level 42
- 1986 – Animalization – The Animals
- 1986 – Game Over – Nuclear Assault
- 1986 – The Pink Opaque – Cocteau Twins
- 1986 – After Dark – Johnny Adams
- 1986 – Unveiling the Wicked – Exciter
- 1986 – Atomizer – Big Black
- 1986 – Dancing on the Edge – Roy Buchanan
- 1986 – Bayou Boogie – BeauSoleil
- 1986 – True Colours – Level 42
- 1985 – Hellish Crossfire – Iron Angel
- 1985 – I Am the Night – Pantera
- 1985 – Promise – Sade
- 1985 – Nail – Foetus
- 1985 – Skeptics Apocalypse – Agent Steel
- 1985 – Long Live the Loud – Exciter
- 1985 – Gotta Let This Hen Out! – Robyn Hitchcock and the Egyptians
- 1985 – World Machine – Level 42
- 1985 – Hello Central...Give Me Dr. Jazz – Bob Brozman
- 1985 – Open the Door – Pentangle
- 1985 – Haven't You Heard – Paul Laurence
- 1985 – Deckchairs Overboard – Deckchairs Overboard
- 1985 – Standing in the Line of Fire – Gary U.S. Bonds
- 1985 – Showdown! – Albert Collins, Robert Cray & Johnny Copeland
- 1985 – Queen of the Blues – Koko Taylor
- 1985 – When a Guitar Plays the Blues – Roy Buchanan
- 1985 – Pressure Cooker – Clarence "Gatemouth" Brown
- 1984 – How We Rock – SSD
- 1984 – King of the World – Mighty Sparrow
- 1984 – Ride the Lightning – Metallica
- 1984 – Escape – Whodini
- 1984 – Commercial Zone – Public Image Ltd
- 1984 – Guitar Slinger – Johnny Winter
- 1984 – City Babys Revenge – Charged GBH
- 1984 – Diamond Life – Sade
- 1984 – How Men Are – Heaven 17
- 1984 – Burning Star – Helstar
- 1984 – Suddenly – Billy Ocean
- 1984 – From the Heart – Johnny Adams
- 1984 – Doot-Doot – Freur
- 1984 – Jealousy – Touchstone
- 1984 – Don't Break the Oath – Mercyful Fate
- 1983 – Hittin' the Road Again – Red Holloway
- 1983 – Mongo Magic – Mongo Santamaría
- 1983 – High-Rise – Ashford & Simpson
- 1983 – Bar Room Preacher – Jimmy Johnson
- 1983 – Listen – A Flock of Seagulls
- 1983 – Land of the Lost – The Freeze
- 1983 – Live – The Rods
- 1983 – Check It! – Mutabaruka
- 1982 – Midnight Blue – Louise Tucker
- 1982 – A Flock of Seagulls – A Flock of Seagulls
- 1982 – Miscellaneous Abstract Record No. 1 – Rosalie Sorrels
- 1982 – November Group – November Group
- 1981 – Something Special – Kool & the Gang
- 1981 – What a Woman Needs – Melba Moore
- 1980 – Celebrate! – Kool & the Gang
- 1980 – National Lampoon White Album – National Lampoon

=== 1990s ===
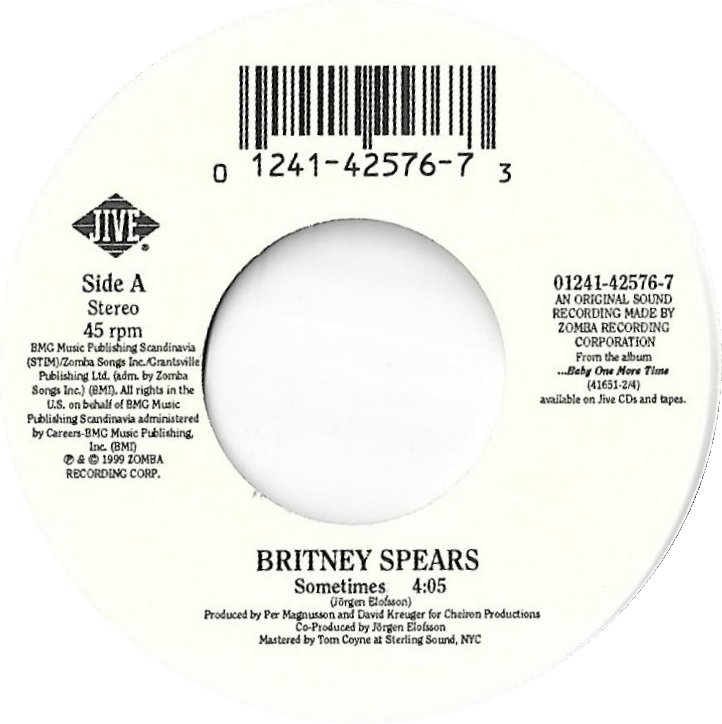
A vinyl record mastered by Coyne

- 1999 – Walking Off the Buzz – Blessid Union of Souls
- 1999 – A Prince Among Thieves – Prince Paul
- 1999 – There's a Poison Goin' On – Public Enemy
- 1999 – Vol. 3... Life and Times of S. Carter – Jay Z
- 1999 – Beneath the Surface – GZA
- 1999 – Chyna Doll – Foxy Brown
- 1999 – Coming of Age – Memphis Bleek
- 1999 – ...Baby One More Time – Britney Spears
- 1999 – Venni Vetti Vecci – Ja Rule
- 1999 – Millennium – Backstreet Boys
- 1999 – Imajin – Imajin
- 1998 – Bobby Digital in Stereo – RZA
- 1998 – Dearest Christian, I'm So Very Sorry for Bringing You Here. Love, Dad – P.M. Dawn
- 1998 – Embrya – Maxwell
- 1998 – The Love Movement – A Tribe Called Quest
- 1998 – Foundation – Brand Nubian
- 1998 – E.L.E. (Extinction Level Event): The Final World Front – Busta Rhymes
- 1998 – Soul Survivor – Pete Rock
- 1998 – Make It Reign – Lord Tariq and Peter Gunz
- 1998 – Last Time Around: Live at Legends – Buddy Guy
- 1997 – That's Them – Artifacts
- 1997 – The Black Bossalini – Spice 1
- 1997 – Get Some – Snot
- 1997 – When Disaster Strikes... – Busta Rhymes
- 1997 – Da Dirty 30 – Cru
- 1997 – Forever – Bobby Brown
- 1997 – Jock Jams, Volume 3 – Various Artists
- 1997 – Backstreet's Back – Backstreet Boys
- 1997 – Phenomenon – LL Cool J
- 1997 – Love Always – K-Ci & JoJo
- 1997 – Live – Erykah Badu
- 1997 – The Pick, the Sickle and the Shovel – Gravediggaz
- 1997 – Long Time No See – Chico DeBarge
- 1997 – One Day It'll All Make Sense – Common
- 1997 – The Mix Tape, Vol. II – Funkmaster Flex
- 1997 – Holonic-The Self Megamix – DJ Krush
- 1997 – God Sound – Boogiemonsters
- 1997 – Wu-Tang Forever – Wu-Tang Clan
- 1997 – Solid HarmoniE – Solid HarmoniE
- 1997 – Scout's Honor... by Way of Blood – Rampage
- 1997 – Salisbury – Uriah Heep
- 1997 – All That I Am – Joe
- 1997 – Chupacabra – Imani Coppola
- 1997 – Paradisiaque – MC Solaar
- 1997 – Dangerous Ground – Various Artists
- 1996 – I Am L.V. – L.V.
- 1996 – Backstreet Boys – Backstreet Boys
- 1996 – Gravity – Da Bush Babees
- 1996 – High School High – Various Artists
- 1996 – Off Parole – Rappin' 4-Tay
- 1996 – All Frames of the Game – Playaz Tryna Strive
- 1996 – Maxwell's Urban Hang Suite – Maxwell
- 1996 – Here to Save You All – Chino XL
- 1996 – Beats, Rhymes and Life – A Tribe Called Quest
- 1996 – It Was Written – Nas
- 1996 – Wild Cowboys – Sadat X
- 1996 – From Where??? – Skillz
- 1996 – Gettin' It (Album Number Ten) – Too Short
- 1996 – The Nutty Professor – Various Artists
- 1996 – Takin' Mine – Heather B.
- 1996 – Sa-Deuce – Sa-Deuce
- 1996 – Autobiography of Mistachuck – Chuck D
- 1996 – Ill Na Na – Foxy Brown
- 1996 – Realms 'n Reality – Cella Dwellas
- 1996 – Illadelph Halflife – The Roots
- 1996 – Red Hot + Rio – Various Artists
- 1996 – Stakes Is High – De La Soul
- 1996 – Time Will Reveal – Above the Law
- 1996 – Peace Beyond Passion – Meshell Ndegeocello
- 1996 – The Hemp Museum – B-Legit
- 1996 – The Coming – Busta Rhymes
- 1996 – Tha Hall of Game – E-40
- 1995 – Mr. Smith – LL Cool J
- 1995 – 2000 – Grand Puba
- 1995 – The Awakening – Lord Finesse
- 1995 – Only Built 4 Cuban Linx... – Raekwon
- 1995 – Game Related – The Click
- 1995 – The Show – Various Artists
- 1995 – 1990-Sick – Spice 1
- 1995 – Liquid Swords – GZA
- 1995 – World Ultimate – The Nonce
- 1995 – Prophecy – Capleton
- 1995 – People Who Fell from the Sky – Mind Funk
- 1995 – Mind of Mystikal – Mystikal
- 1995 – No Man's Land – Souls of Mischief
- 1995 – Cocktails – Too Short
- 1995 – Return to the 36 Chambers: The Dirty Version – Ol' Dirty Bastard
- 1995 – New Jersey Drive, Vol. 1 – Various Artists
- 1994 – Creep wit' Me – Ill Al Skratch
- 1994 – Keep the Fire Burnin' – Dan Hartman
- 1994 – Muse Sick-n-Hour Mess Age – Public Enemy
- 1994 – Fear Itself – Casual
- 1994 – Blowout Comb – Digable Planets
- 1994 – Do You Want More?!!!??! – The Roots
- 1994 – Ambushed – Da Bush Babees
- 1994 – Ring – The Connells
- 1994 – A Low Down Dirty Shame – Various Artists
- 1994 – From the Ground Up – The Roots
- 1994 – Between a Rock and a Hard Place – Artifacts
- 1994 – Super Tight – UGK
- 1994 – Age Ain't Nothing but a Number – Aaliyah
- 1994 – Prose Combat – MC Solaar
- 1994 – Subliminal Simulation – Dream Warriors
- 1994 – Same as It Ever Was – House of Pain
- 1994 – The Big Badass – Ant Banks
- 1993 – Plantation Lullabies – Meshell Ndegeocello
- 1993 – Supermodel of the World – RuPaul
- 1993 – 93 'til Infinity – Souls of Mischief
- 1993 – Reachin' (A New Refutation of Time and Space) – Digable Planets
- 1993 – Buhloone Mindstate – De La Soul
- 1993 – I Hear Black – Overkill
- 1993 – Prototype – Varga
- 1993 – Menace II Society – Various Artists
- 1993 – Midnight Marauders – A Tribe Called Quest
- 1993 – Time to Move On – Billy Ocean
- 1993 – 12 Play – R. Kelly
- 1993 – T.I.M.E. (The Inner Mind's Eye) – Leaders of the New School
- 1993 – Get in Where You Fit In – Too Short
- 1993 – Faithful – Hi-Five
- 1993 – Code Red – DJ Jazzy Jeff & The Fresh Prince
- 1993 – The Polyfuze Method – Kid Rock
- 1993 – Here Come the Lords – Lords of the Underground
- 1992 – Sex and Violence – Boogie Down Productions
- 1992 – F.U. Don't Take It Personal – Fu-Schnickens
- 1992 – In God We Trust – Brand Nubian
- 1992 – Shorty the Pimp – Too Short
- 1992 – Love Deluxe – Sade
- 1992 – Keep It Goin' On – Hi-Five
- 1992 – House of Pain – House of Pain
- 1992 – Too Hard to Swallow – UGK
- 1991 – Homebase – DJ Jazzy Jeff & The Fresh Prince
- 1991 – The Low End Theory – A Tribe Called Quest
- 1991 – Live Hardcore Worldwide – Boogie Down Productions
- 1991 – Funke, Funke Wisdom – Kool Moe Dee
- 1991 – A Wolf in Sheep's Clothing – Black Sheep
- 1991 – Nature of a Sista' – Queen Latifah
- 1991 – De La Soul Is Dead – De La Soul
- 1990 – Grits Sandwiches for Breakfast – Kid Rock
- 1990 – People's Instinctive Travels and the Paths of Rhythm – A Tribe Called Quest
- 1990 – Into Darkness – Winter
- 1990 – By Inheritance – Artillery
- 1990 – Edutainment – Boogie Down Productions
- 1990 – Jump for Joy – Koko Taylor
- 1990 – Sex Packets – Digital Underground
- 1990 – Deicide – Deicide

=== 2000s ===
- 2009 – BLACKsummers'night – Maxwell
- 2009 – Viva Ai – Ai
- 2009 – Sound Awake - Karnivool
- 2009 – In the Mood for Life – Wax Tailor
- 2008 – I Am... Sasha Fierce – Beyoncé
- 2008 – Funhouse – P!nk
- 2008 – Circus – Britney Spears
- 2007 – Blackout – Britney Spears
- 2007 — Wisin vs. Yandel: Los Extraterrestres — Wisin & Yandel
- 2007 – Hope & Sorrow – Wax Tailor
- 2007 – Don't Stop Ai – Ai
- 2007 – Elliott Yamin – Elliott Yamin
- 2007 – Introducing Joss Stone – Joss Stone
- 2006 – What's Goin' On Ai – Ai
- 2006 – Verónica Orozco – Verónica Orozco
- 2006 – I'm Not Dead – P!nk
- 2005 – Mic-a-holic Ai – Ai
- 2004 – Patience – George Michael
- 2004 – On the 6/J.Lo – Jennifer Lopez
- 2004 – Lose My Breath/Soldier – Destiny's Child
- 2003 – Frank – Amy Winehouse
- 2003 – Dangerously in Love – Beyoncé
- 2003 – In the Zone – Britney Spears
- 2002 – X – Def Leppard
- 2002 – Details – Frou Frou
- 2001 – Now – Maxwell
- 2001 – Survivor – Destiny's Child
- 2001 – Mandy Moore – Mandy Moore
- 2001 – O-Town – O-Town
- 2001 – Sol Invictus – Akhenaton
- 2001 – Willa Was Here – Willa Ford
- 2001 – Ghetto Fabulous – Mystikal
- 2001 – Genesis – Busta Rhymes
- 2001 – AOI: Bionix – De La Soul
- 2001 – Crown Royal – Run–D.M.C.
- 2001 – Better Days – Joe
- 2001 – Nivea – Nivea
- 2001 – Britney – Britney Spears
- 2001 – Embrace the Chaos – Ozomatli
- 2001 – All Rise – Blue
- 2001 – Tarantula – Mystikal
- 2001 – I Told You So – Chino XL
- 2000 – Mama's Gun – Erykah Badu
- 2000 – Lover's Rock – Sade
- 2000 – Like Water for Chocolate – Common
- 2000 – The Platform – Dilated Peoples
- 2000 – No Angel – Dido
- 2000 – Human Nature – Human Nature
- 2000 – Late for the Future – Galactic
- 2000 – Oops!... I Did It Again – Britney Spears
- 2000 – Yeeeah Baby – Big Pun
- 2000 – More – Vitamin C
- 2000 – Bridging the Gap – The Black Eyed Peas
- 2000 – Fear of Flying – Mýa
- 2000 – Guru's Jazzmatazz, Vol. 3: Streetsoul – Guru
- 2000 – Art Official Intelligence: Mosaic Thump – De La Soul
- 2000 – My Name Is Joe – Joe
- 2000 – G.O.A.T. – LL Cool J
- 2000 – Art and Life – Beenie Man
- 2000 – Rule 3:36 – Ja Rule
- 2000 – Black & Blue – Backstreet Boys
- 2000 – Voodoo – D'Angelo

=== 2010s ===
- 2017 – Wa to Yo – Ai
- 2017 – Cayendo – Nicole Pernigotti
- 2017 – Time in a Vacuum – Franzone
- 2017 – Confusion – Fase39
- 2017 – Speak to Me – Amy Lee
- 2017 – Gang Signs & Prayer – Stormzy
- 2017 – The Valley – Betty Who
- 2017 – Fifty Shades Darker [Original Motion Picture Soundtrack] – Danny Elfman
- 2017 – Dear Evan Hansen: Original Broadway Cast Recording – Benj Pasek / Justin Paul
- 2017 – Believer (single) – Imagine Dragons
- 2017 – Thankful – New Kids on the Block
- 2017 – Animal World 動物世界 – Joker Xue 薛之謙
- 2016 – Jyunjo Randoseru - Akai Ko-en
- 2016 – And the Anonymous Nobody... – De La Soul
- 2016 – Dangerous Woman – Ariana Grande
- 2016 – Crazy Girl – Jordan White
- 2016 – 24K Magic – Bruno Mars
- 2016 – Boxes – Goo Goo Dolls
- 2016 – Ripcord – Keith Urban
- 2016 – Joanne – Lady Gaga
- 2016 – Starboy – The Weeknd
- 2016 – Sit Still, Look Pretty – Daya
- 2016 – Glory Days – Little Mix
- 2016 – Dream Machine – Tokio Hotel
- 2016 – Lady Wood – Tove Lo
- 2016 – "How To Be A Human Being" – Glass Animals
- 2016 – Fantôme – Hikaru Utada
- 2016 – Made – BigBang
- 2016 – Selamanya Cinta - Shila Amzah featuring Alif Satar
- 2016 – My Journey - Shila Amzah
- 2015 – Royalty – Chris Brown
- 2015 – 25 – Adele
- 2015 – Estilo libre – Gepe
- 2015 – Hamilton (Broadway Cast Recording)
- 2015 – Lesser Oceans – Fences
- 2015 – Daya – Daya
- 2015 – The Bass Bass (Trail Mix) – Franzone
- 2015 – Piece of Music – Franzone
- 2015 – Fan of a Fan: The Album – Chris Brown and Tyga
- 2015 – Uptown Special – Mark Ronson
- 2015 – Confident – Demi Lovato
- 2014 – 1989 – Taylor Swift
- 2014 – Rose ave. – You+Me
- 2014 – Four – One Direction
- 2014 – Sex and Love – Enrique Iglesias
- 2014 – Otra era – Javiera Mena
- 2014 – Sweet Talker – Jessie J
- 2014 – Trail – Franzone
- 2014 – X – Chris Brown
- 2014 – My Everything – Ariana Grande
- 2014 – In the Lonely Hour – Sam Smith
- 2014 – The London Sessions – Mary J. Blige
- 2014 – Rise – Taeyang
- 2013 – Moriagaro – Ai
- 2013 – In limine – Silvia Tancredi
- 2013 – 3.0 – Marc Anthony
- 2013 – Super Best Records: 15th Celebration – Misia
- 2013 – BEYONCÉ – Beyoncé
- 2013 – Avril Lavigne – Avril Lavigne
- 2013 – Midnight Memories – One Direction
- 2012 – The Truth About Love – P!nk
- 2012 – The Heist – Macklemore and Ryan Lewis
- 2012 – Fortune – Chris Brown
- 2012 – Overexposed – Maroon 5
- 2012 – Independent – Ai
- 2012 – Looking 4 Myself – Usher
- 2012 – Red – Taylor Swift
- 2012 – Songs of the Third and Fifth – The Mark of Cain
- 2011 – F.A.M.E. – Chris Brown
- 2011 – 21 – Adele
- 2010 – Body Talk – Robyn
- 2010 – This Is the Warning – Dead Letter Circus
- 2010 – "Mr. Saxobeat" – Alexandra Stan
