= Body Heat (disambiguation) =

Body Heat is a 1981 film by Lawrence Kasdan.

Body Heat may also refer to:

- Thermoregulation, the ability of an organism to keep its body temperature within certain boundaries
- Body Heat (Blue System album)
- Body Heat (Quincy Jones album)
- "Bodyheat", a 1976 song by James Brown
- Bodyheat (album), a James Brown album containing the song
- "Body Heat", a 1989 single by Australian rock band Roxus
- "Body Heat", a 2015 song by American singer Selena Gomez from her second studio album Revival
