= Mutha's Nature =

Studio album by James Brown
- Released: July 22, 1977
- Recorded: February – March 1977
- Studios: A & R (New York City, New York); Sound Ideas (New York City); Criteria (Miami, Florida); International (Augusta, Georgia)
- Genre: Funk
- Length: 36:40
- Labels: Polydor; 6111
- Producer: James Brown

James Brown chronology
Bodyheat (1976)	Mutha's Nature (1977)	Jam 1980's (1978)

Singles from Mutha's Nature
- 1. "Give Me Some Skin / People Wake Up and Live" Released: July 1977; 2. "Summertime / Take Me Higher and Groove Me" Released: November 1977; 3. "If You Don't Give a Doggone About It / People Who Criticize" Released: November 1977; 4. "Have a Happy Day" Released: February 1978

Mutha's Nature is an album by the American musician James Brown, released in 1977 through Polydor Records. It was arranged by Charles Sherwell and James Brown, with Sarah Pergantis credited for the cover illustration. The album's title is a play on "Mother Nature".

== Critical reception ==
Professional ratings
Review scores
Source	Rating
AllMusic	2/5 stars
Robert Christgau	C
The Rolling Stone Album Guide	2.5/5 stars

The Bay State Banner praised "the skeletal, hard-driving, bottom-conscious funk with an equally hard-driving preaching vocal overhead."

== Track listing ==
No.	Title	Writer(s)	Length
1.	"Give Me Some Skin"	Deanna Brown, Yamma Brown	3:58
2.	"People Who Criticize"	James Brown, Flower (Larry John Gordon)	4:27
3.	"Have a Happy Day"	Charles Sherrell	4:14
4.	"Bessie"	James Brown, Charles Sherrell, Johnny Griggs, Melvin Parker, St. Clair Pinckney	3:24
5.	"If You Don't Give a Doggone About It"	James Brown, Deanna Brown	6:31
6.	"Summertime"	George Gershwin, DuBose Heyward	5:29
7.	"People Wake Up and Live"	James Brown	3:32
8.	"Take Me Higher and Groove Me"	James Brown, Deirdre Brown	5:01

== Personnel ==
- James Brown – lead vocals, piano ("People Who Criticize")
- “Sweet” Charles Sherrell – background vocals, clavinet, synthesizer, electric organ, bass guitar
- Martha High – background vocals
- Hollie Farris, Russell Crimes – trumpet
- Joe Poff – alto saxophone
- St. Clair Pinckney, Peyton “P.J.” Johnson – tenor saxophone
- Mike Lawler – keyboards
- Jimmy Nolen, Robert Coleman – electric guitar
- David Weston – bass guitar
- Johnny Griggs – congas, percussion
- Tony Cook – drums
