= Get Up Offa That Thing (album) =

Studio album by James Brown
- Released: July 1976
- Recorded: April 19 – June 18, 1976
- Studio: Criteria Studios (Miami, Florida); International Studios (Augusta, Georgia)
- Genre: Funk
- Length: 42:20
- Label: Polydor; 6071
- Producer: James Brown

James Brown chronology
Hot (1976)	Get Up Offa That Thing (1976)	Bodyheat (1976)

Singles from Get Up Offa That Thing
- 1. "Get Up Offa That Thing" Released: May 1976; 2. "I Refuse to Lose / Home Again" Released: October 1976

Professional ratings
Review scores
Source	Rating
AllMusic	3/5 stars
Robert Christgau	B−
The Rolling Stone Album Guide	3/5 stars

Get Up Offa That Thing is the 43rd studio album by American musician James Brown. The album was released in July of 1976 by Polydor Records.

== Track listing ==
All tracks are written by Deanna Brown, Deirdre Brown and Yamma Brown; except where indicated.

No.	Title	Writer(s)	Length
1.	"Get Up Offa That Thing / Release the Pressure"		9:16
2.	"You Took My Heart"	Deanna Brown, Deirdre Brown, St. Clair Pinckney, Yamma Brown	3:23
3.	"I Refuse to Lose"		7:33
4.	"Can't Take It With You"		9:07
5.	"Home Again"		4:39
6.	"This Feeling"		8:22

== Personnel ==
=== Musicians ===
- James Brown – lead vocals, arrangement
- various bandmembers – backing vocals
- Hollie Farris, Russell Crimes – trumpet
- Joe Poff – alto saxophone
- St. Clair Pinckney, Peyton "P.J." Johnson – tenor saxophone
- Mike Lawler – clavinet, electric organ, piano
- Jimmy Nolen, Robert Coleman – electric guitar
- "Sweet" Charles Sherrell – bass guitar
- Melvin Parker – drums

=== Production ===
- Patricia Dryden – cover illustration
