= Jam 1980's =

Album by James Brown

Studio album by James Brown
- Released: March 1978
- Recorded: December 1977
- Studio: Mastersound (Augusta, Georgia)
- Genre: Funk; disco
- Length: 38:18
- Label: Polydor; 6140
- Producer: James Brown

James Brown chronology
Mutha's Nature (1977)	Jam 1980's (1978)	Take a Look at Those Cakes (1978)

Singles from Jam 1980's
- 1. "Eyesight / I Never, Never, Never Will Forget" Released: March 1978; 2. "The Spank" Released: May 1978; 3. "Nature" Released: November 1978

Jam 1980's is an album by the American musician James Brown. It was released in March of 1978 by Polydor Records. The album was arranged by James Brown, with Sweet Charles Sherrell arranging "Nature".

== Critical reception ==
Professional ratings
Review scores
Source	Rating
AllMusic	2/5 stars
Robert Christgau	B+
(The New) Rolling Stone Album Guide	2.5/5 stars
The Virgin Encyclopedia of R&B and Soul	3/5 stars

The Ottawa Journal called Jam 1980's "a slick album meeting the current disco craze head on," writing that the song "Jam" is "a masterpiece of disco soul."

== Track listing ==
No.	Title	Writer(s)	Length
1.	"Jam"	James Brown, Deirdre Brown	11:47
2.	"The Spank"	James Brown, Charles Sherrell	6:45
3.	"Nature"	Deirdre Brown, Joe Brown	10:17
4.	"Eyesight"	James Brown, Deirdre Brown	5:30
5.	"I Never, Never, Never Will Forget"	James Brown	3:59

== Personnel ==
- James Brown – lead vocals, clavinet ("The Spank")
- Hollie Farris – trumpet
- Joe Poff – alto saxophone
- Peyton "P.J." Johnson, St. Clair Pinckney – tenor saxophone
- Jimmy Nolen, Keith Gregory – electric guitar
- "Sweet" Charles "Sherrell – bass guitar, electric piano, clavinet
- David Weston – bass guitar
- Johnny Griggs – percussion
- Tony Cook – drums
