= Gravity (Bush Babees album) =

Studio album by Da Bush Babees
- Released: October 15, 1996
- Recorded: 1995−1996
- Studio: Battery (New York, NY)
- Genre: Hip-hop
- Length: 49:08
- Label: Warner Bros.
- Producer: Charles Harrison; Christopher Harrison; Mr. Man; Posdnuos; Rahzel; Shawn J. Period; the Ummah

Da Bush Babees chronology
Ambushed (1994)	Gravity (1996)

Singles from Gravity
- 1. "The Love Song" Released: 1996

Gravity is the second and final studio album by American hip-hop group Da Bush Babees, released on October 15, 1996, via Warner Bros. Records. The recording sessions took place at Battery Studios in New York City. The album was produced by Mr. Man, Shawn J Period, the Ummah, Charles Harrison, Christopher Harrison, Posdnuos, and Rahzel. It features guest appearances from Mos Def, Muntcho Leo, and Nicole "Disco" Johnson.

The album debuted at number 75 on the Billboard Top R&B Albums chart. Its lead single, "The Love Song", made it to number 66 on the Hot R&B/Hip-Hop Songs, number 74 on the R&B/Hip-Hop Airplay, number 89 on the R&B/Hip-Hop Streaming Songs and number 15 on the Hot Rap Songs charts.

Along with fellow Native Tongues cohorts De La Soul's Stakes Is High, Gravity is notable for jump-starting the hip-hop career of Mos Def, who is featured on three tracks on the album ("Intro", "S.O.S." and "The Love Song"). Warner Bros. released the group from its contract after the album ran its course.

== Critical reception ==
Professional ratings
Review scores
Source	Rating
AllMusic	4/5 stars
RapReviews	10/10
The Source	3/5 stars

The Dayton Daily News wrote that "Wax" "is a cool, jazzy, danceable number that should get plenty of club play among youth and adult-oriented audiences". The Staten Island Advance called "3 MCs" "a kinetic old-school combination of microphone-tossing routines".

== Track listing ==
No.	Title	Writer(s)	Producer(s)	Length
1.	"Intro" (performed by Mos Def)	Dante Smith	Shawn J. Period	2:41
2.	"Gravity" (featuring Nicole "Disco" Johnson)	Acklins Dillon; Jamahl Hanna; Harold Lee	The Ummah	3:54
3.	"Wax"	Dillon; Hanna; Lee	Mr. Man	4:00
4.	"The Beat Down"	Rozell M. Brown	Rahzel	0:59
5.	"Maybe"	Dillon	Mr. Man	4:03
6.	"3 MCs"	Dillon; Hanna; Lee; Jonathan Davis	The Ummah	3:57
7.	"S.O.S." (featuring Mos Def)	Dillon; Hanna; Lee; Smith	Mr. Man	4:58
8.	"God Complex"	Dillon; Hanna; Lee	Shawn J. Period	4:35
9.	"The Ruler"	Lee; Kurtis Walker; David Reeves; Aaron O'Bryant	Mr. Man	4:09
10.	"The Ninth Presentation"	Dillon	Mr. Man	1:44
11.	"The Love Song" (featuring Mos Def)	Dillon; Hanna; Lee; Smith; James Castor; John Pruitt; Gerry Thomas	Posdnuos	4:40
12.	"Rock Boots"		Charles and Chris Harrison	0:46
13.	"In Meh Dreams" (featuring Muntcho Leo)	Dillon; D. Stephenson	Mr. Man	2:49
14.	"Melting Plastic"	Dillon; Hanna; Lee	Shawn J. Period	4:05
15.	"Outro"	Dillon; Hanna; Lee	Shawn J. Period	1:48
Total length:				49:08

Sample credits

- Track 9 embodies portions of the composition "If I Ruled the World" written by Kurtis Walker, David Reeves and Aaron O'Bryant.
- Track 11 contains samples from "It's Just Begun" written by James Castor, Johnny Pruitt and Jerry Thomas and performed by Jimmy Castor Bunch, "Onsaya Joy" written and performed by Richard Holmes, and "Summer Madness" written by Alton Taylor, Robert Mickens, Robert Bell, Ronald Bell, Gary Brown, Dennis Thomas and Claydes Smith and performed by Kool & the Gang.

== Personnel ==
- Acklins "Mr. Man" Dillon – vocals, producer (tracks: 3, 5, 7, 9, 10, 13), co-executive producer
- Jamahl "Y-Tee" Hanna – vocals, co-executive producer
- Harold "Babe-B-Face Kaos" Lee – vocals, co-executive producer
- Dante "Mos Def" Smith – vocals (tracks: 1, 7, 10)
- Nicole "Disco" Johnson – vocals (track 2)
- D. "Muntcho Leo" Stephenson – vocals (track 13)
- Shawn M. "Shawn J. Period" Jones – producer (tracks: 1, 8, 14, 15)
- Jonathan "Q-Tip" Davis – producer (tracks: 2, 6)
- Rahzel M. Brown – producer & arranger (track 4)
- Kelvin "Posdnuos" Mercer – producer (track 11)
- Charles Harrison – producer (track 12)
- Christopher Harrison – producer (track 12)
- Michael Gilbert – recording (tracks: 1, 3, 5–11, 13–15)
- Tim Donovan – recording (tracks: 2, 12)
- Daniel Wierup – recording (tracks: 3, 11), mixing assistant (tracks: 4, 10)
- Ken "Duro" Ifill – recording (tracks: 4, 5), mixing (tracks: 1, 3–5, 8, 10, 12–15)
- Bob Power – mixing (tracks: 2, 6)
- Tim Latham – mixing (tracks: 7, 10)
- Jed Hackett – recording assistant (tracks: 1, 2, 5–8, 13), mixing assistant (tracks: 1, 2, 5–8, 11, 13–15)
- John Meredith – recording assistant (tracks: 1, 15)
- Charles McCrorey – recording assistant (tracks: 7, 9, 10)
- Tom Coyne – mastering
- Ian Alexander – executive producer, A&R
- William "Kedar" Massenburg – executive producer
- Kojo Bentil – co-executive producer
- Gregory Gilmer – art direction, design
- Daniel Hastings – photography

== Charts ==
Chart (1996)	Peak position
US Top R&B Albums (Billboard)	75
