= For Goodness Sakes, Look at Those Cakes =

"For Goodness Sakes, Look at Those Cakes (Part 1)"

Single by James Brown

from the album Take a Look at Those Cakes
- B-side: "For Goodness Sakes, Look at Those Cakes (Part 2)"
- Released: October 1978
- Genre: Funk
- Length: 3:22 (Part 1); 4:17 (Part 2)
- Label: Polydor; 14522
- Songwriter(s): James Brown; Deidre Brown
- Producer(s): James Brown

James Brown charting singles chronology
| "The Spank" (1978) | "For Goodness Sakes, Look at Those Cakes (Part 1)" (1978) | "It's Too Funky in Here" (1979) |

Audio video
- "For Goodness Sakes, Take A Look At Those Cakes (Pt.1)" on YouTube

"For Goodness Sakes, Look at Those Cakes" is a song written and performed by James Brown. Released as an edited two-part single in 1978, it charted #52 R&B in 1979. A full-length version appears on the album Take a Look at Those Cakes. Brown talks loudly and clearly in rhyme with only brief singing involved, this track being in part a precursor to the hip hop style which was yet to mount on record in a few years time. Robert Christgau described the song as "a great throwaway--an eleven-minute rumination on ass-watching, including genuinely tasteless suggestions that Ray Charles and Stevie Wonder join the fun."
