= The Rods =

American heavy metal band

- Origin: Cortland, New York, U.S.
- Genres: Heavy metal, hard rock
- Years active: 1980–1986, 2008–present
- Labels: Arista; Shrapnel; Combat; Passport; Niji Entertainment; Steamhammer
- Members: David "Rock" Feinstein; Carl Canedy; Michael San Ciro; Freddy Villano
- Past members: Steve Starmer; Rick Caudle; Craig Gruber; Shmoulik Avigal; Garry Bordonaro
- Website: therods.com

The Rods are an American heavy metal band formed in 1980 by David "Rock" Feinstein (guitar, vocals) [Born in 1947], Steven Starmer (bass, vocals), Rods (tambourine, maracas, cowbell), and Carl Canedy (drums, vocals). After the first album Starmer was replaced by Garry Bordonaro. Feinstein had first come to mainstream attention after playing in Elf with his cousin Ronnie James Dio. The Rods' sound differed considerably from Elf, adopting a more traditional heavy metal sound compared with the boogie-rock sound that Elf preferred.

Their first album was originally released independently as Rock Hard in 1980 and the following year the band was signed by Arista Records, who reordered the album tracks and released it simply titled The Rods. Their second album Wild Dogs followed in 1982 and was re-released in 2004.

The Rods' third album, released 1983, was entitled In the Raw. In 1984 Canedy and Bordonaro played on Jack Starr's album Out of the Darkness with Rhett Forrester of Riot and Gary Driscoll of Rainbow. Then in 1984 the Rods released their fourth studio album Let Them Eat Metal and recorded the album The Rods Live. Their album Heavier Than Thou was originally released in 1986. An album was also released the same year, entitled Hollywood under the name Canedy, Feinstein, Bordonaro & Caudle (all of the band members). Rick Caudle handled lead vocals on that album, with Feinstein only playing guitar. Following poor sales of their final two albums the group split up.

Canedy is also a producer of heavy metal bands, and his credits include Anthrax's Armed and Dangerous and Spreading the Disease, Exciter's Violence & Force, Overkill's Feel the Fire, Possessed's Beyond the Gates and Roxx Gang's Love 'Em and Leave 'Em.

In 2008 the Rods announced that they were reuniting with the line-up of Feinstein, Bordonaro and Canedy, and in August 2008 they played at the Metal Rock Fest in Lillehammer, Norway. The album Vengeance was released in 2011 to positive reviews, and The Brotherhood of Metal was released in 2019.

On November 9, 2023, the band announced their new album, Rattle the Cage, would be released on January 12, 2024.

== Discography ==
- Rock Hard (1980), reissued as The Rods (1981)
- Full Throttle (EP) (1981)
- Wild Dogs (1982)
- In the Raw (1983)
- The Rods (Live) (1983)
- Let Them Eat Metal (1984)
- Hollywood (1986), Reissued in (2015) – Released under the name Canedy, Feinstein, Bordonaro & Caudle
- Heavier Than Thou (1986)
- Vengeance (2011)
- Brotherhood of Metal (2019)
- Rattle the Cage (2024)
