= Thrash Speed Burn =

Studio album by Exciter
- Released: February 22, 2008
- Recorded: September–December 2007
- Studio: NCode Studio, Ottawa, Ontario, Canada
- Genre: Speed metal; thrash metal
- Length: 45:38
- Label: Massacre Records (Germany); Blistering Records (Sweden)
- Producer: Charles Fairfield

Exciter chronology
| New Testament (2004) | Thrash Speed Burn (2008) | Death Machine (2010) |

Thrash Speed Burn is the tenth studio album by Canadian speed metal band Exciter, released in 2008. It marks the debut of new singer Kenny "Metal Mouth" Winter, who joined the band in October 2006. The album had previously been set to release on November 9 but was pushed back to February 22, 2008, by their label Massacre Records. Before its release, the band posted a live clip of their new song "In Mortal Fear", recorded during the group's 2005 appearance at the Bang Your Head!!! festival in Balingen, Germany. The album was released under their label Massacre Records in Germany and by Blistering Records in Sweden.

== Critical reception ==
Professional ratings
Review scores
| Source | Rating |
|---|---|
| Blabbermouth | 7/10 |
| Rock Hard | 8/10 |
| Dangerdog | 3.75/5.0 stars |
| MetalReviews | 70/100 |
| Metal1 | 6/10 |

Reception of the album has been generally positive, with many critics praising its sound and stating how several songs, such as the title track "Thrash Speed Burn", "Massacre Mountain" and "The Punisher", felt as if they were made in the 80s.

German metal review outlet Metal1 stated that "During the good 45 minutes of 'Thrash, Speed, Burn' Exciter show themselves the way their fans like them best because the record sounds as if it had beamed itself straight from the 80s into 2008 - with all the advantages and disadvantages." Concluding with: "Exciter have managed to gain a more than loyal fan base for 30 years, but without ever making it into the upper league of Thrash. "Thrash, Speed, Burn" won't change that much either. The disc offers solid fare for friends of the good old 80s, nothing more and nothing less. Fans and Thrash completists hit it, the rest can do without it."

A review from Blabbermouth gave a decent review of the album, praising songs such as the title track "Thrash Speed Burn" and "Massacre Mountain". They commented how it is an album with "two distinct 'sides' though, keeping it from becoming a blockbuster; it is a good disc nonetheless. The album's first five songs are absolute face-slashers; openers 'Massacre Mountain' and the title track especially will take you back to the kind of Metallica breakneck riff fusillades that made 'Kill 'Em All' such a molten blast of thrash. John Ricci's riffs and soul-lacerating solos are heard far too infrequently in today's scene and vocalist Kenny Winter sports a banshee wail dripping with malevolent attitude." However, they criticized the second half of the album saying "Side two loses some of the momentum established by those first five marauders. That is not to say that songs like 'Betrayal' and 'Evil Omen' are poor efforts; they just approach middling and do not possess the same fire-breathing intensity."

== Track listing ==
| No. | Title | Length |
|---|---|---|
| 1. | "Massacre Mountain" | 4:06 |
| 2. | "Thrash Speed Burn" | 5:01 |
| 3. | "In Mortal Fear" | 4:50 |
| 4. | "Crucifixion" | 6:21 |
| 5. | "Demon's Gate" | 3:45 |
| 6. | "Hangman" | 3:01 |
| 7. | "Evil Omen" | 5:40 |
| 8. | "Betrayal" | 4:21 |
| 9. | "The Punisher" | 4:11 |
| 10. | "Rot the Devil King" | 4:22 |
| Total length: | | 45:38 |

== Personnel ==
Exciter

- Kenny "Metal Mouth" Winter – vocals
- John Ricci – guitars
- Rob "Clammy" Cohen – bass
- Rik Charron – drums

Production

- Andy Brown – artwork
- Charles Fairfield – producer, engineering
