= The Spank =

Single by James Brown

from the album Jam/1980's
- B-side: "Love Me Tender"
- Released: May 1978
- Genre: Funk
- Length: 3:40
- Label: Polydor; 14487
- Songwriter(s): James Brown; Charles Sherrell
- Producer(s): James Brown

James Brown charting singles chronology
"Eyesight" (1978)	"The Spank" (1978)	"For Goodness Sakes, Look at Those Cakes (Part 1)" (1978)

Audio video
- "The Spank" on YouTube

"The Spank" is a song written by James Brown and Charles Sherrell and recorded by Brown. It was released as a single in 1978, backed by Brown's recording of the Elvis Presley song "Love Me Tender". It charted #26 R&B. It also appeared on the 1978 album Jam/1980's. The song is named after a popular dance of the time.
