= Emerald Eyes =

Studio album by Iron Angel
- Released: 2 October 2020
- Recorded: October – December 2019
- Studio: DaDaSound Studios, Hamburg, Germany: Mixing and mastering between December 2019 and March 2020
- Genre: Speed metal, heavy metal
- Length: 42:37
- Label: Mighty Music
- Producer: Jan Kirchner

Iron Angel chronology
Hellbound (2018)	Emerald Eyes (2020)

Emerald Eyes is the fourth studio and final studio album by German speed metal band Iron Angel, released on 2 October 2020 by Mighty Music. A music video was made for "Sands of Time", and two promo videos were made for "Sacred Slaughter" and "Bridges Are Burning".

== Track listing ==
No.	Title	Lyrics	Music	Length
1.	"Sacred Slaughter"	Behr	Behr	4:23
2.	"Descend"	Behr	Altenbach	4:06
3.	"Sands of Time"	Behr	Behr	3:24
4.	"Demons"	Behr	Helfrich	4:06
5.	"What We're Living For"	Behr	Altenbach	5:33
6.	"Emerald Eyes"	Behr	Behr	4:37
7.	"Fiery Winds of Death"	Behr	Altenbach	3:31
8.	"Sacrificed"	Behr	Helfrich	4:36
9.	"Bridges Are Burning"	Behr	Behr	4:26
10.	"Heaven in Red"	Behr	Behr	3:55

== Personnel ==
- Dirk Schröder – vocals
- Robert Altenbach – guitars
- Nino Helfrich – guitars
- Didy Mackel – bass
- Maximilian Behr – drums

Guest musician

- Nico-Collin Schröder – backing vocals

Production

- Jan Kirchner – mixing, producer, mastering, engineering
