= Exciter (Exciter album) =

Studio album by Exciter
- Released: April 1988
- Recorded: Metalworks Studios, Toronto, Canada
- Genre: Heavy metal, speed metal
- Length: 38:55
- Label: Maze Music
- Producer: Ed Stone, Exciter

Exciter chronology
Unveiling the Wicked (1986)	Exciter (1988)	Kill After Kill (1992)

Professional ratings
Review scores
Source	Rating
AllMusic	1.5/5 stars
Collector's Guide to Heavy Metal	6/10

Exciter is the fifth studio album by Canadian speed metal band Exciter, released through Maze Music in 1988. It was re-released in 1995 by Magnetic Air Records and again by Megaforce Records in 2005 with the title O.T.T., which stands for "Over the Top". This is the first album as a quartet, with new frontman Rob Malnati replacing Dan Beehler as lead vocalist of the band; however Beehler still performs drums and backing vocals.

== Track listing ==
All tracks are written by McPhee, Johnson and Beehler

No.	Title	Length
1.	"Scream Bloody Murder"	4:40
2.	"Back in the Light"	3:34
3.	"Ready to Rock"	4:17
4.	"O.T.T." (stands for "Over the Top")	3:59
5.	"I Wanna Be King"	4:22
6.	"Enemy Lines"	4:00
7.	"Dying to Live"	4:35
8.	"Playin' with Fire"	4:34
9.	"Eyes in the Sky"	4:54

=== Bonus track 1995 & 2005 editions ===
No.	Title	Length
10.	"Termination"	2:17

== Credits ==
- Rob Malnati – lead vocals, guitar
- Brian McPhee – guitar, vocals
- Allan Johnson – bass
- Dan Beehler – drums, vocals

Production

- Leidecker Productions – production management
- J.C. Caprara – concept
- Zoran Busic – management
