= Kiss in 77 =

Single by James Brown

from the album Bodyheat
- B-side: "Woman"
- Released: 1977
- Genre: Funk, disco
- Length: 3:38
- Label: Polydor; 14388
- Songwriter(s): Charles Sherrell
- Producer(s): James Brown

James Brown charting singles chronology
"Bodyheat (Part 1)" (1976)	"Kiss in 77" (1977)	"Give Me Some Skin" (1977)

Audio video
- "Kiss In 77" on YouTube

"Kiss in 77" is a song written by Charles Sherrell and recorded by James Brown. Released as a single in 1977, it charted #35 R&B. It also appeared on the album Bodyheat. Robert Christgau gave the song a negative review, commenting sarcastically that it was "as 'brand new' as the 'New Sound!' [Brown] promises" on the jacket of its host album.
