= Violence & Force =

Studio album by Exciter
- Released: February 1984
- Recorded: November 1983
- Studio: Pyramid Sound Studios, Ithaca, New York
- Genre: Speed metal
- Length: 41:34
- Label: Megaforce
- Producer: Carl Canedy, Jon Zazula

Exciter chronology
Heavy Metal Maniac (1983)	Violence & Force (1984)	Long Live the Loud (1985)

Professional ratings
Review scores
Source	Rating
AllMusic	3/5 stars
Collector's Guide to Heavy Metal	7/10
Kerrang!	(mixed)

Violence & Force is the second studio album by the Canadian speed metal band Exciter, released through Megaforce Records in February 1984. The album was produced by The Rods drummer Carl Canedy, who had already produced Anthrax's debut album Fistful of Metal.

The album was reissued in 1999 by SPV/Steamhammer with the same track listing and again in 2004 by Megaforce, without the song "Evil Sinner".

== Track listing ==
Side one: Heavy
No.	Title	Length
1.	"Oblivion"	0:34
2.	"Violence & Force"	4:04
3.	"Scream in the Night"	4:13
4.	"Pounding Metal"	4:33
5.	"Evil Sinner"	4:58

Side two: Metal
No.	Title	Length
6.	"Destructor"	4:19
7.	"Swords of Darkness"	3:58
8.	"Delivering to the Master"	6:06
9.	"Saxons of the Fire"	3:27
10.	"War Is Hell"	6:18

== Personnel ==
=== Exciter ===
- Dan Beehler − vocals, drums
- John Ricci − guitar, backing vocals
- Allan Johnson – bass, backing vocals

=== Production ===
- Carl Canedy – producer
- Exciter – arrangements
- Chris Bubacz – engineer
- Alex Perialas – assistant engineer
- Jack Skinner – mastering at Sterling Sound, New York
- Jon Zazula – executive producer
- Andy Brown – artwork
