= Kill After Kill =

Studio album by Exciter
- Released: 1992
- Recorded: Leidecker Music Productions, Ottawa, Ontario, Canada
- Genre: Speed metal
- Length: 37:59
- Label: Dark Wings/Spy Records (Canada); Noise International (rest of the world)
- Producer: Exciter, Manfred Leidecker

Exciter chronology
Exciter (1988)	Kill After Kill (1992)	Better Live Than Dead (1993)

Professional ratings
Review scores
Source	Rating
AllMusic	1.5/5 stars
Collector's Guide to Heavy Metal	6/10

Kill After Kill is the sixth studio album by the Canadian speed metal band Exciter, released in 1992. It was the last album to feature founding member, singer/drummer Dan Beehler, only album with bassist David Ledden, and the first to feature guitarist John Ricci since 1985's Long Live the Loud.

== Track listing ==
All music by John Ricci and Dan Beehler. All lyrics by Beehler.

No.	Title	Length
1.	"Rain of Terror"	5:04
2.	"No Life No Future"	3:53
3.	"Cold Blooded Murder"	3:55
4.	"Smashin 'em Down"	3:09
5.	"Shadow of the Cross"	5:26
6.	"Dog Eat Dog"	3:18
7.	"Anger, Hate & Destruction"	4:26
8.	"The Second Coming"	4:35
9.	"Born to Kill" (live)	4:08

== Personnel ==
- Dan Beehler – vocals, backing vocals, drums
- John Ricci – guitars
- David Ledden – bass

Production

- Manfred Leidecker – mixing
- Neil Campbell – mixing

== External sites ==
- "Exciter – Kill After Kill". Encyclopaedia Metallum.
