= Take a Look at Those Cakes =

Studio album by James Brown
- Released: November 1978
- Recorded: September – October 1978
- Studio: Mastersound (Augusta, Georgia)
- Genre: Funk
- Length: 41:30
- Label: Polydor; 6181
- Producer: James Brown

James Brown chronology
Jam 1980's (1978)	Take a Look at Those Cakes (1978)	The Original Disco Man (1979)

Singles from Take a Look at Those Cakes
- 1. "For Goodness Sakes, Look at Those Cakes" Released: 1978; 2. "Someone to Talk To" Released: 1979

Professional ratings
Review scores
Source	Rating
AllMusic	2.5/5 stars
Robert Christgau	B−
The Rolling Stone Album Guide	3/5 stars
The Virgin Encyclopedia of R&B and Soul	3/5 stars

Take a Look at Those Cakes is a studio album by the American musician James Brown. It was released in December 1978 by Polydor Records. It was arranged by Brown and St. Clair Pinckney. The cover artwork was credited to Christoph Blumrich.

== Track listing ==
No.	Title	Writer(s)	Length
1.	"For Goodness Sakes, Look at Those Cakes"	James Brown, Deirdre Brown	11:04
2.	"A Man Understands"	James Brown, Deirdre Brown	8:30
3.	"Someone to Talk To"	James Brown, St. Clair Pinckney	7:02
4.	"Spring"	James Brown, Deirdre Brown, St. Clair Pinckney	6:37
5.	"As Long as I Love You"	James Brown, Deirdre Brown, St. Clair Pinckney	8:17

== Personnel ==
- James Brown – lead vocals
- Martha High, Anne McLeod, probably Florence Raynor, various band members – backing vocals
- Hollie Farris – trumpet
- Joe Poff – alto saxophone, flute
- St. Clair Pinckney – tenor saxophone, flute
- probably Jerry Poindexter – electric piano
- Jimmy Nolen – electric guitar
- David Weston – bass guitar
- Johnny Griggs – bongos, percussion
- Tony Cook – drums
