= Martha High =

American singer (born 1945)

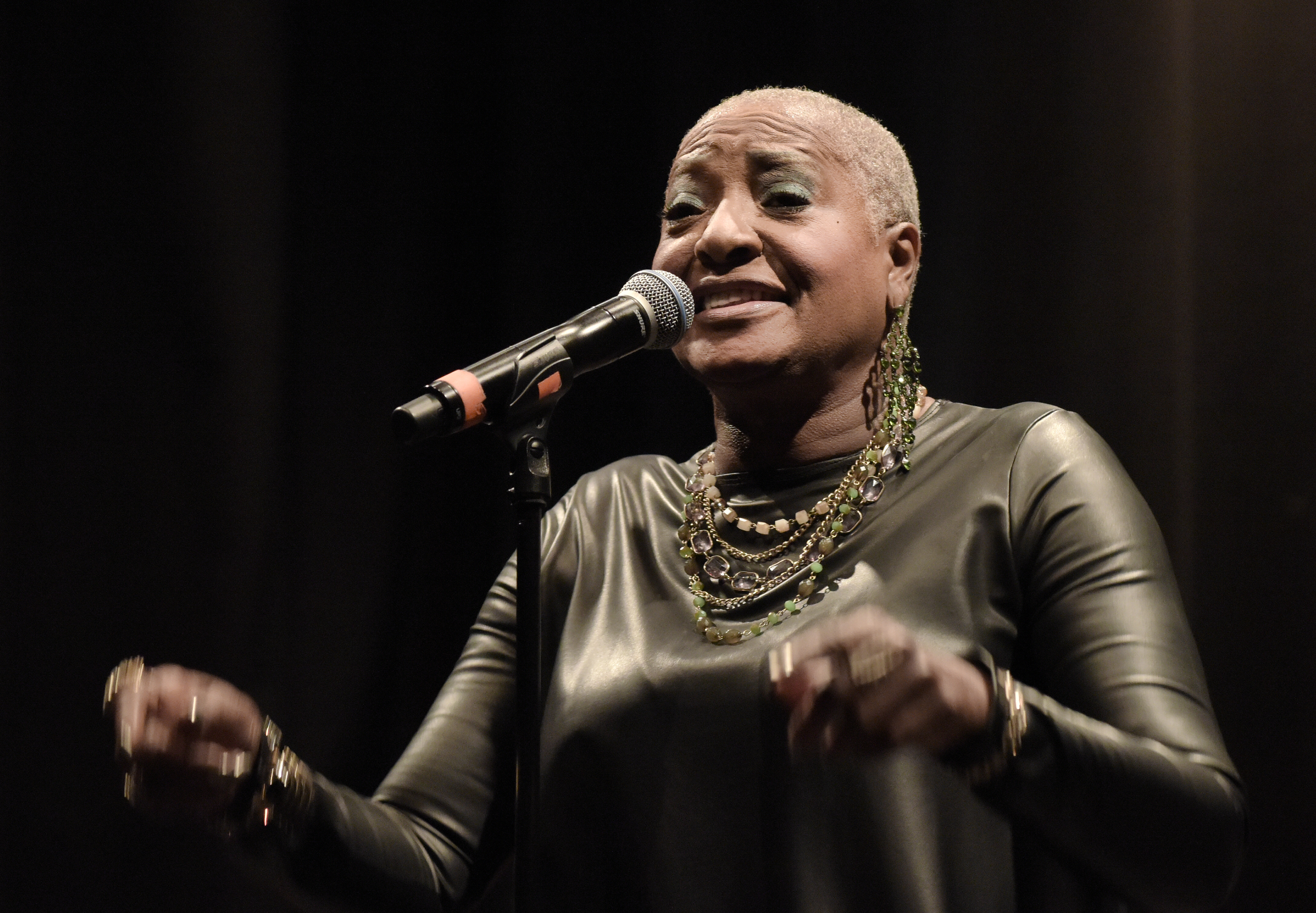
- High in 2017

Background information
- Born: Martha Harvin; January 8, 1945 (age 81); Victoria, Virginia, U.S.
- Origin: Washington, D.C., U.S.
- Genres: Soul, R&B, funk
- Occupations: Singer; songwriter; author
- Years active: 1963–present
- Labels: Only One; Salsoul; Diaspora Connections; Freestyle; People; Blind Faith; Ropeadope
- Website: www.facebook.com/originalfunkydiva/

Martha Harvin (born January 8, 1945), known professionally as Martha High, is an American singer-songwriter. High began her career in the early 1960s as a member of the female vocal group The Jewels. After a string of unsuccessful singles, the group released their only charting single "Opportunity" to minor success. The Jewels eventually became the background vocalist of James Brown in 1964 and continued to tour with him until they disbanded in 1968. High continued on performing as a background singer for Brown.

In the 1970s, she embarked on a solo career, releasing two singles "Georgy Girl" (1972) and "Try Me" (1972) on James Brown's recording label People Records. In 1979, she released her self-titled debut album on Salsoul Records to minor success. In 1980, she returned to performing as James Brown's principle backing vocalist until 1998, respectively. Afterwards, she joined several of her James Brown revue colleagues including Lyn Collins and Maceo Parker on various concert tours.

In 2008, High revamped her solo career and released her second live album titled W.O.M.A.N. With several independent record labels and music bands, she released several studio albums including: It's High Time (2009), Soul Overdue (2012), Singing for the Good Times (2016), Tribute to My Soul Sisters (2018), Nothing's Going Wrong (2020), Got My Senses Back (2021), Soul Brother Where Art Thou? Vol. 2: A Tribute to James Brown (2022), The Magic of Christmas (2022), and Jazz and Blues (2024).

== Early life ==
Martha Harvin was born on January 8, 1945, in Victoria, Virginia, U.S. Her family relocated to Washington, D.C. where she began singing in the junior choir at Mount Olive Baptist Church and Trinity AME Zion Church. She attended and graduated from Roosevelt High School in 1963.

== Career ==
=== 1963–1968: The Jewels ===
In 1963, High formed a female group called The Bo-ettes, whom became the background singers for American musician Bo Diddley. The group consisted of Zeola Gay (sister of Marvin Gaye), Sharon Madison, and Yvonne Smith. Diddley was also working with another female group called The Four Jewels, which High had attended high school with the members. After Carrie Mingo departed from The Four Jewels, Diddley added High to the group. The Jewels recorded their version of "Baby It's You", released as a single on Tec Records. Their next single "Time for Love" was released on Checker Records. After limited success, the group moved to New York City to sign with newly-formed label Dimension Records. Their first single on Dimension Records titled "Opportunity" began a moderate success on the charts, peaking at number 63 on the Billboard Hot 100 and number 18 on the US Hot R&B Singles chart. After a follow-up single, "But I Do" b/w "Smokey Joe", flopped, they were dropped from Dimension Records.

The group eventually met James Brown and toured as his background singers. Although the group were originally signed to do three performances with Brown, they toured with him for over a year. After an extensive touring schedule, most of the group grew tired and ultimately wanted to return home as High continued to tour with Brown. The group became known simply as The Jewels after the departure of Margie Clarke. In 1965, The Jewels released a single titled "Papa Left Mama Holding the Bag", produced by Brown and released on his short-lived record label Dynamite Records. They continued working with Brown on several of his recording along with Brown producing The Jewels' singles "Lookie Lookie Lookie" (1967) and "Baby Don't You Know" (1968); both released on Brown's home recording label King Records. After years of limited success and performing as background singers for Brown, the group disbanded in 1968.

=== 1969–1980: James Brown and solo album ===
High continued her music career and signed on as James Brown's principle background singer. Brown gave her the stage name Martha High as he felt that Martha Harvin "isn't a name for the stage." In 1971, she signed with Brown's record label People Records. She released two singles while on the label, a cover version of the songs "Georgy Girl" and "Try Me". In 1974, she provided the background vocals for Brown's album The Payback. She contributed the opening background vocals for his single "The Payback", which peaked at number 26 on the Billboard Hot 100. The song also became certified gold by the Recording Industry Association of America (RIAA). In 1976, she performed backing vocals for Brown's song "Bodyheat". In July 1977, she dueted with Brown on the song "Summertime" for his album Mutha's Nature. In November 1977, Brown released a single "Take Me Higher and Groove Me", which featured Martha High, from the Mutha's Nature album. The single peaked at number 48 in Italy.

Shortly after, Brown negotiated a one-album deal with disco record label Salsoul Records on behalf of High. She began working on disco album which would be produced by Brown. Her song "Showdown" was featured on the Salsoul Records compilation album We Funk the Best. In November 1979, she released her self-titled debut album on Salsoul Records. The album ultimately flopped as disco began a rapid decline in mainstream popularity. However, the album spawned two singles "He's My Ding Dong Man" and "Showdown", the latter of which peaked at number 99 on the US National Disco chart. After leaving Salsoul Records, she returned to performing a background singer for Brown.

=== 1998–2007: King's Queens and Maceo Parker ===
In January 1998, High left background singing for Brown. She formed a group with other former background vocalists of Brown called King's Queens. The group consisted of High, Vicki Anderson, Lyn Collins, and Marva Whitney. The group had recorded several songs for an album, produced by Bobby Byrd, Bootsy Collins, and Fred Wesley but the album was never released. In April 1998, a compilation album titled James Brown's Original Funky Divas, which featured songs from High as well as former group The Jewels, was released on PolyGram Records. In 2000, High began touring with J.B. colleague Maceo Parker as his featured vocalist until 2016. In 2003, High recorded a live album titled Live at Quai Du Blues in France. In 2004, High teamed up with the Soulpower organization, which is also behind the comebacks of Soul artists like Marva Whitney, Lyn Collins, Bobby Byrd, Gwen McCrae and RAMP. During her collaboration with Soulpower, High performed all across Europe and even performed in Africa, backed by the Soulpower Allstars. In February 2005, High embarked on the James Brown's Funky Divas Tour in Europe, with James Brown revue colleague Lyn Collins.

=== 2008–present: Re-emergence ===
In 2008, High re-ignited her solo career. She began recording and performing with several different bands. She released her second live album W.O.M.A.N. on Soulbeat Records in May 2008. The album, which featured several covered songs, was recorded with a French band called the Shaolin Temple Defenders at . She continued to tour with the band and often joined Maceo Parker for several performances. The following year, she released her second studio album It's High Time on Diaspora Connections. It's High Time featured original songs written by High. By 2010, she began performing with another band called Speedometer, with whom she recorded her third album Soul Overdue, released in 2012. She featured on the group's single "The Shakedown (Say Yeah)".

While performing in Rome with Speedometer, High was introduced to Italian music producer Luca Sapio. They exchanged phone numbers and remained in contact. Sapio later approached High with recording and producing her next album. She returned to Rome to begin working with Sapio on her fourth album. In April 2016, High released her fourth studio album Singing for the Good Times on Blind Faith Records. The album, which featured original songs, spawned the sole single "Lovelight". Throughout the remainder of the year, she toured with an Italian funk band known as the Italian Royal Family, whom also played on her fifth album. In 2017, High recorded a single titled "We Are One" with DJ Toner, released on Enlace Funk (Spain). Fred Thomas (The J.B.´s musician) also collaborated playing bass. She released her fifth album Tribute to My Soul Sisters in November 2017 on Record Kicks. The album featured cover songs from her female colleagues including Vicki Anderson, Lyn Collins, Marva Whitney, and The Jewels. In January 2020, she released sixth album Nothing's Going Wrong on Blind Faith Records. The album was her second release with the Italian Royal Family band.

In August 2021, High released her seventh album titled Got My Senses Back, with Grey and the Hit Me Band on Only One Records. Her follow-up album with Grey and Hit Me Band titled Jazz and Blues was released in January 2024. Later that year, Martha High formed a group called Martha High and the Funky Divas, with Bernadette Pires and Mayke Smit. Later that year, they released two singles: "I'm Too Tough for Mr. Big Stuff" and "The Message from the Soul Sisters". In March 2025, the group released a single titled "Soul Sister".

== Personal life ==
High was married twice. She has a daughter and two sons. In 1995, her two sons were killed in an accident.

== Legacy ==
On March 17, 2008, Martha High alongside The Jewels were honored for their contributions to the arts and culture of Washington, D.C. in an award ceremony at The Kennedy Center Concert Hall by the city's then-mayor, Adrian Fenty. In 2012, she was featured in PBS documentary The Jewels: The Divas of DC Doo-Wop. In February 2026, The Jewels were honored with The Jewels Way Designation Act of 2026, which designates 13th Street, N.W. between Upshur Street, N.W. and Allison Street, N.W. as The Jewels Way. In the same month, High was the recipient of the Lifetime Achievement Award at the 29th Golden Ladybug of Popularity in Skopje.

== Discography ==
=== Albums ===
- Martha High (1979)
- Live at Quai Du Blues (2003)
- W.O.M.A.N. (2008)
- It's High Time (2009)
- Soul Overdue (2012)
- Singing for the Good Times (2016)
- Tribute to My Soul Sisters (2018)
- Nothing's Going Wrong (2020)
- Got My Senses Back (2021)
- Soul Brother Where Art Thou? Vol. 2: A Tribute to James Brown (2022)
- The Magic of Christmas (2022)
- Jazz and Blues (2024)

=== Singles ===
- "Georgy Girl" (1972)
- "Take Me Higher and Groove Me" (with James Brown) (1977)
- "Spank Georgia Disco" (1978)
- "He's My Ding Dong Man" (1979)
- "Showdown" (1979)
- "The Big Payback" (2007)
- "The Shakedown (Say Yeah)" (2012)
- "I'd Rather Go Blind" (2012)
- "Lovelight" (2016)
- "We Are One" (2017)
- "A Little Taste of Soul" (2017)
- "I'm Too Tough for Mr. Big Stuff" (2024)
- "The Message from the Soul Sisters" (2024)
- "Soul Sister" (2025)

== Other appearances ==
- Presenting… The James Brown Show (LP by various artists, 1967) Smash 27087 (mono) & 67087 (stereo)

"This Is My Story" and "Something's Got A Hold On Me" by The Jewels

- James Brown's Original Funky Divas (CD compilation, 1998) PolyGram 314 537 709-2

"This Is My Story" by The Jewels
"Summertime" by Martha And James

- Love Over-Due (album by James Brown, 1991) Scotti Bros. 72392 75225-1

"Later For Dancing" (duet with James Brown)

- Martha High (CD, 2014) on Octave-lav/Ultra-Vybe inc. 5067)
- Reissue of Salsoul 8526 with 4 bonus-tracks

== Published works ==
- He's a Funny Cat Ms. High: My 32 Years Singing With James Brown (2017)
