= Hellbound (Iron Angel album) =

Studio album by Iron Angel
- Released: 4 May 2018
- Recorded: June – August 2017
- Studio: Rosenquarz Tonstudio, Lübeck, Germany: Mixing & Mastering between September and November 2017
- Genre: Speed metal, heavy metal
- Length: 46:50
- Label: Mighty Music
- Producer: Michael Hahn

Iron Angel chronology
Winds of War (1986)	Hellbound (2018)	Emerald Eyes (2020)

Hellbound is the third studio album by German speed metal band Iron Angel, released on 4 May 2018 by Mighty Music. It is the band's first album since 1986's Winds of War, and the first to feature a brand new line-up assembled by vocalist Dirk Schröder. A music video was made for "Ministry of Metal". A promo video was made for "Blood and Leather".

== Track listing ==
No.	Title	Lyrics	Music	Length
1.	"Writing´s on the wall"	Behr, Schröder	Meyer	5:13
2.	"Judgement day"	Behr	Meyer	4:24
3.	"Hell and back"	Behr, Schröder	Meyer	5:17
4.	"Carnivore flashmob"	Behr	Altenbach	6:09
5.	"Blood and leather"	Behr	Meyer	4:26
6.	"Deliverance in black"	Behr	Meyer	5:43
7.	"Waiting for a miracle"	Behr, Schröder	Meyer	3:38
8.	"Hellbound"	Behr, Schröder	Meyer	3:44
9.	"Purist of sin"	Behr	Meyer	4:46
10.	"Ministry of metal"	Behr	Meyer	3:30

== Personnel ==
- Dirk Schröder – vocals
- Robert Altenbach – guitars
- Mitsch Meyer – guitars
- Didy Mackel – bass
- Maximilian Behr – drums

Guest musician

- Hilke Braun – backing vocals

Production

- Michael Hahn – mixing, producer, mastering
- Andreas Libera – engineering
