= Winds of War (album) =

Studio album by Iron Angel
- Released: June 1986
- Recorded: Karo Music Studio, Münster, Germany, April 1986
- Genre: Speed metal, heavy metal, hard rock
- Length: 39:00
- Label: SPV GmbH
- Producer: Kalle Trapp

Iron Angel chronology
| Hellish Crossfire (1985) | Winds of War (1986) | Hellbound (2018) |

Professional ratings
Review scores
| Source | Rating |
|---|---|
| AllMusic | 2.5/5 stars |

Winds of War is the second album by German speed metal band Iron Angel, released in June 1986. It was the band's last album until the 2018 release of Hellbound.

== Track listing ==
Side – Iron
| No. | Title | Lyrics | Music | Length |
|---|---|---|---|---|
| 1. | "Winds of War" | Matthes | Matthes, Wittke, Strüven | 2:13 |
| 2. | "Metalstorm" | Matthes | Wittke, Strüven | 3:26 |
| 3. | "Son of a Bitch" | Matthes | Strüven | 3:27 |
| 4. | "Vicious" | Strüven | Strüven | 4:16 |
| 5. | "Born to Rock" | Matthes, Strüven | Wittke, Strüven | 3:55 |

Side – Angel
| No. | Title | Lyrics | Music | Length |
|---|---|---|---|---|
| 6. | "Fight for Your Life" | Strüven | Wittke, Strüven | 4:30 |
| 7. | "Stronger than Steel" | Matthes | Wittke, Strüven | 5:52 |
| 8. | "Sea of Flames" | Matthes | Wittke, Strüven | 5:15 |
| 9. | "Creatures of Destruction" | Matthes | Matthes, Wittke, Strüven | 4:15 |
| 10. | "Back to the Silence" | Matthes | Wittke | 1:51 |

The 2004 and 2014 re-issues contains a live recorded performance from Warpke, Germany on 20 July 1985 during the Hellish Crossfire tour

| No. | Title | Length |
|---|---|---|
| 1. | "The Metallian" (Live) | 4:35 |
| 2. | "Sinner 666" (Live) | 2:46 |
| 3. | "Black Mass" (Live) | 5:51 |
| 4. | "The Church of the Lost Souls" (Live) | 3:35 |
| 5. | "Rush of Power" (Live) | 3:19 |
| 6. | "Hunter in Chains" (Live) | 5:12 |
| 7. | "Legions of Evil" (Live) | 5:13 |

== Personnel ==
- Dirk Schröder – vocals
- Peter Wittke – guitars
- Sven Strüven – guitars
- Thorsten Lohmann – bass
- Mike Matthes – drums

Additional musician

- Jürgen Blackmore – guitars on "Sea of Flames"

Production

- Kalle Trapp – production
- Uwe Ziegler – engineering
- Sidney Sohn – remastering
- Tatiana Lima – executive producer
