= No Remorse Tour =

1984 concert tour by Motörhead

- Tour by Motörhead
- Poster to the concert in Santa Barbara, California
- Associated album: No Remorse
- Start date: 26 April 1984
- End date: 30 December 1984
- Legs: 7
- No. of shows: 91

Motörhead concert chronology
- Another Perfect Tour (1983); No Remorse Tour (1984); 10th Anniversary Tour (1985)

The No Remorse Tour, sometimes called No Remorse Death on the Road Tour was a concert tour by heavy metal band Motörhead in support of their compilation album, No Remorse. It was the first tour for the new line up of Phil Campbell, Würzel, and Pete Gill.

== Background ==
Around 1984, Motörhead were beginning to feel that they wished to leave their current record label, Bronze Records. However, over two years ensured of legal issues that kept the band from recording an album. On top of this, Phil Campbell was still contracted with his previous band, Persian Risk's label, Metal Masters. Drummer Pete Gill was also still in litigation with some money that his previous band, Saxon had owed him. As a result of this, only Lemmy and Würzel were able to take credit on the new tracks in No Remorse. As a result, the band decided that for the time being, doing a tour would be good.

== Overview ==
Lemmy expressed that having a completely new line up of members "took ten years off of me, easy, 'cause they were so excited. The tour saw the band playing shows at Australia and New Zealand for the very first time. On 2 August, at the Shellharbour Club, Motörhead played one of their smallest shows, to a crowd of only 15 people in attendance.

During their 2 December show at Cleveland, the band broke the world record for having the loudest show in the world, at 130 decibels beating The Who's previous record by 10 decibels. It was so loud that it cracked the theatre ceiling, sending plaster down onto the crowd below. Eventually a maintenance worker had to shut Motörhead's concert down, before the damage stopped. A man living near the venue reported that he was able to record the show from his living room.

Around early September, the band took a break to write a couple of songs for what would be their next album Orgasmatron. One of them, "Nothing Up My Sleeve", would be added into the setlist after that. Partway through the UK leg, in early November 1984, Wurzel had to step out for a couple of shows due to having kidney stones, so the band simply kept going as a three-piece. During the show at Hammersmith Odeon, he was taken out on a wheelchair and played a couple of songs.

On 15 December, Wendy O' Williams made a guest appearance and sung No Class with the band.

== Setlist ==
1. "Iron Fist"
2. "Stay Clean"
3. "Heart of Stone"
4. "The Hammer"
5. "Metropolis"
6. "Shoot You in the Back"
7. "Jailbait"
8. "Killed by Death"
9. "Ace of Spades"
10. "Steal Your Face"
11. "Nothing Up My Sleeve" (added on 12 October)
12. "(We Are) The Road Crew"
13. "Bite the Bullet"
14. "The Chase Is Better Than the Catch"
15. "No Class"
16. "Motorhead"

Encore

17. "Bomber"
18. "Overkill"

=== Other songs played ===
- "Over the Top"
- "Too Late Too Late"
- "America"
- "Locomotive"

== Tour dates ==
List of 1984 concerts
Date	City	Country	Venue	Support act(s)
26 April 1984	Helsinki	Finland	Lepakko	—N/a
27 April 1984	Kasino	Finland	Kauhajoki	—N/a
28 April 1984	Nivala	Finland	Tuiskula	—N/a
29 April 1984	Siilinjärvi	Finland	Huvikumpu	—N/a
30 April 1984	Alavus	Finland	Aulava	—N/a
1 May 1984	Tampere	Finland	Hepokatti	—N/a
7 May 1984	London	England	Hammersmith Odeon	Fist; Youngblood
3 June 1984	Douglas	Isle of Man	Palace Lido (Isle of Man TT)	—N/a
10 June 1984	Poperinge	Belgium	Don Bosco Sportzone (Heavy Sound Festival)	—N/a
20 July 1984	Dunedin	New Zealand	Dunedin Town Hall	—N/a
21 July 1984	Christchurch	New Zealand	Christchurch Town Hall	—N/a
23 July 1984	Wellington	New Zealand	Wellington Show & Sports Building	—N/a
24 July 1984	Palmerston North	New Zealand	Regent on Broadway	—N/a
25 July 1984	Napier	New Zealand	Napier Municipal Theatre	—N/a
26 July 1984	Rotorua	New Zealand	Rotorua Civic Theatre	—N/a
27 July 1984	Auckland	New Zealand	Mainstreet Cabaret	—N/a
28 July 1984	Auckland	New Zealand	Mainstreet Cabaret	—N/a
30 July 1984	Melbourne	Australia	Palais Theatre	—N/a
31 July 1984	Geelong	Australia	Palais Royal Theatre	—N/a
1 August 1984	Griffith	Australia	Yoogali Club	—N/a
2 August 1984	Shellharbour	Australia	Shellharbour Club	—N/a
3 August 1984	Sydney	Australia	The Family Inn	—N/a
4 August 1984	Sydney	Australia	Selina's Coogee Bay Hotel	Lightning Rock
5 August 1984	Shellharbour	Australia	Shellharbour Club	—N/a
7 August 1984	Adelaide	Australia	Bridgeway Hotel	—N/a
8 August 1984	Adelaide	Australia	Bridgeway Hotel	—N/a
9 August 1984	Melbourne	Australia	The Venue	—N/a
10 August 1984	Melbourne	Australia	The Venue	—N/a
11 August 1984	Melbourne	Australia	Tarmac Club	—N/a
12 August 1984	Melbourne	Australia	Tarmac Club	—N/a
13 August 1984	Melbourne	Australia	Nunawading Skate Ranch	—N/a
14 August 1984	Sydney	Australia	Caringbah Inn	—N/a
15 August 1984	Newcastle	Australia	Newcastle Workers Club	—N/a
16 August 1984	Lismore	Australia	Central Coast Workers Club	—N/a
17 August 1984	Brisbane	Australia	Unknown venue	—N/a
18 August 1984	Gold Coast	Australia	Jet Club	—N/a
20 August 1984	Goulburn	Australia	Goulburn Work Club	—N/a
21 August 1984	Sydney	Australia	Manly Vale Hotel	—N/a
22 August 1984	Penrith	Australia	Penrith Panthers Leagues Club	—N/a
23 August 1984	Penrith	Australia	Sweethearts	—N/a
25 August 1984	Perth	Australia	White Sands Hotel	—N/a
26 August 1984	Perth	Australia	Nookenburra Hotel	—N/a
21 September 1984	Budapest	Hungary	Volan SC Sporttelep	Pokolgép; P. Box
22 September 1984	Debrecen	Hungary	Stadion Dózsa György út	P. Box
24 September 1984	Belgrade	Yugoslavia	Pionir Hall	—N/a
25 September 1984	Sarajevo	Yugoslavia	—N/a	—N/a
12 October 1984	Great Yarmouth	England	Caister-on-Sea	Persian Risk
13 October 1984	Birmingham	England	Ladbrokes Holiday Village (Kerrang! Wooargh Weekender)	—N/a
24 October 1984	Exeter	England	University of Exeter	Persian Risk
25 October 1984	Nottingham	England	Nottingham Royal Concert Hall	Persian Risk
26 October 1984	Coventry	England	University of Warwick	Persian Risk
27 October 1984	Bradford	England	University of Bradford	Persian Risk
28 October 1984	Birmingham	England	Birmingham Odeon	Persian Risk
29 October 1984	Manchester	England	Manchester Apollo	Persian Risk
30 October 1984	Sheffield	England	Sheffield City Hall	Persian Risk
31 October 1984	Middlesbrough	England	Middlesbrough Town Hall Crypt	Persian Risk
1 November 1984	Newcastle upon Tyne	England	Mayfair Ballroom	Persian Risk
2 November 1984	Edinburgh	Scotland	Edinburgh Playhouse	Persian Risk
3 November 1984	Glasgow	Scotland	Barrowland Ballroom	Persian Risk
5 November 1984	Margate	England	Margate Winter Gardens	Persian Risk
6 November 1984	Reading	England	University of Reading	Persian Risk
7 November 1984	London	England	Hammersmith Odeon	Persian Risk
19 November 1984	Sacramento	United States	Sacramento Memorial Auditorium	Exciter; Mercyful Fate
20 November 1984	San Francisco	United States	The Warfield	Exciter; Mercyful Fate
21 November 1984	Santa Barbara	United States	Arlington Theatre	Exciter; Mercyful Fate
23 November 1984	Los Angeles	United States	Hollywood Palladium	Exciter; Mercyful Fate
24 November 1984	San Diego	United States	Adams Avenue Theatre	Exciter; Mercyful Fate
25 November 1984	Phoenix	United States	Strutts	Exciter; Mercyful Fate
27 November 1984	San Antonio	United States	Freeman Coliseum	Exciter; Mercyful Fate
28 November 1984	Dallas	United States	Bronco Bowl	Exciter; Mercyful Fate
1 December 1984	Chicago	United States	Aragon Ballroom	Exciter; Mercyful Fate
2 December 1984	Cleveland	United States	Variety Theatre	Exciter; Mercyful Fate
4 December 1984	Milwaukee	United States	Eagles Club	Exciter; Mercyful Fate
5 December 1984	Detroit	United States	Grand Circus Theatre	Exciter; Mercyful Fate
~~6 December 1984~~	Pittsburgh	United States	Syria Mosque	Exciter; Mercyful Fate
6 December 1984	Buffalo	United States	Rooftop Skyroom	Exciter; Mercyful Fate
7 December 1984	Rochester	United States	Auditorium Theatre	Exciter; Mercyful Fate
8 December 1984	Upper Darby	United States	Tower Theater	Exciter; Mercyful Fate
11 December 1984	Norfolk	United States	The Boathouse	Exciter; Mercyful Fate
12 December 1984	Washington, D.C.	United States	Ontario Theater	Exciter; Mercyful Fate
13 December 1984	Worcester	United States	E. M. Loew's Theatre of Performing Arts	Exciter; Mercyful Fate
14 December 1984	New York City	United States	Beacon Theatre	Exciter; Mercyful Fate
15 December 1984	Passaic	United States	Capitol Theatre	Exciter; Mercyful Fate
16 December 1984	Providence	United States	The Living Room	Exciter; Mercyful Fate
17 December 1984	Montreal	Canada	Le Spectrum	Exciter; Mercyful Fate
18 December 1984	Toronto	Canada	The Concert Hall	Exciter; Mercyful Fate
26 December 1984	Rüsselsheim am Main	West Germany	Ruesselsheim Walter Koebel Halle	Mercyful Fate; Helix; Girlschool
27 December 1984	Essen	West Germany	Pink Palace	Mercyful Fate; Helix; Girlschool
28 December 1984	Völklingen	West Germany	Sporthalle	Mercyful Fate; Helix; Girlschool
29 December 1984	Bad Rappenau	West Germany	Sporthalle	Mercyful Fate; Helix; Girlschool
30 December 1984	Neunkirchen am Brand	West Germany	Hemmerleinhalle	Mercyful Fate; Helix; Girlschool

== Personnel ==
- Lemmy Kilmister – bass guitar, vocals
- Phil "Wizzö" Campbell – guitar
- Michael "Würzel" Burston – guitar
- Pete Gill – drums
