= Ambushed (album) =

Studio album by Da Bush Babees
- Released: 1994
- Studio: Desta (New York, NY); Kross Wire (Atlanta, GA); Greene St. (New York, NY); D&D (New York, NY); The Crib/Palm Tree (New York, NY); Unique (New York, NY); Chung King (New York, NY)
- Genre: Hip-hop
- Length: 47:36
- Label: Reprise
- Producer: Ali Shaheed Muhammad; Jermaine Dupri; J. Prins; Leroy Southwell; Mark Batson; Nikke Nicole; Salaam Remi

Da Bush Babees chronology
Ambushed (1994)	Gravity (1996)

Singles from Ambushed
- 1. "Swing It" Released: 1994; 2. "We Run Things (It's Like Dat)" Released: 1994; 3. "Remember We" Released: 1995

Ambushed is the debut studio album by American hip-hop group Da Bush Babees. It was released on December 6, 1994, via Reprise Records. The recording sessions took place at Desta Recording Studios, Greene St. Recording, D&D Studios, The Crib/Palm Tree Studios, Unique Recording Studios, and Chung King Studios, in New York, and at Krosswire Studio in Atlanta, with additional recording at Firehouse Studio in New York. The album was produced by J. Prins, Jermaine Dupri, Mark Batson, Nikke Nicole, Leroy Southwell, Salaam Remi, Ali Shaheed Muhammad, Mr. Man, Babe-B-Face Kaos, and Y-Tee. It features a guest appearance from 2 Unorthodox.

In the United States, the album debuted at number 83 on the Top R&B Albums charts. It was supported with three singles: "Swing It", "We Run Things (It's Like Dat)" and "Remember We". Its second single, "We Run Things" peaked at number 99 on the Hot R&B/Hip-Hop Songs and number 41 on the Hot Rap Songs charts. The third single off of the album, "Remember We", made it to number 34 on the Hot Rap Songs chart.

== Critical reception ==
Professional ratings
Review scores
Source	Rating
AllMusic	2.5/5 stars
Chicago Tribune	3/4 stars
Entertainment Weekly	B+
The Source	3.5/5 stars

Dimitri Ehrlich of Entertainment Weekly found the Brooklyn trio "lay witty similes and culturally resonant references over frenetic dancehall backdrops on Ambushed", he continued: "their wild-style assault on language is always lighthearted but never lightweight". The Chicago Tribune noted that "Y-Tee, Bae-B-Face Kaos and Mr. Man swing fat lyrics over fatter beats in a fluid, this-side-of-crazy style reminiscent of Poor Righteous Teachers crossed with Cypress Hill." Joseph Charles of The Source noted that "their style is hard to catch at first, but it's extremely clever", resuming: "while there is a bit of material that could be classified as filler ("Clear My Throat" is one example)... Da Bush Babees bring more than enough to satisfy reggae hip-hop fans and freestyle fanatics". AllMusic's John Bush wrote: "Da Bush Babees mix hip-hop and reggae rhythms. Even their delivery switches back and forth between hip-hop cool and ragga hot".

== Track listing ==
No.	Title	Writer(s)	Producer(s)	Length
1.	"Intro"			0:32
2.	"Pon de Attack"	Jamahl Hanna; Harold Lee; Acklins Dillon; Joe Matias; Mark Brown; Winston Riley	J. Prins; Mr. Man (co.)	3:35
3.	"Put It Down"	Hanna; Lee; Dillon; Jermaine Mauldin; Manuel Seal	Jermaine Dupri	3:39
4.	"Original"	Hanna; Lee; Dillon; Mark Batson	Mark Batson; Babe-B-Face Kaos (co.); Y-Tee (co.)	4:48
5.	"Ruff N' Rugged"	Hanna; Lee; Dillon; Nicole Miller; Leroy Southwell	Nikke Nicole; Leroy Southwell	3:44
6.	"Just Can't Stand It"	Hanna; Lee; Dillon; Salaam Gibbs	Salaam Remi	4:46
7.	"Da Ignorant No It All"			1:48
8.	"Hit 'Em Up" (featuring II Unorthodox)	Hanna; Lee; Dillon; Tyrone Cooper; Sydney Prince; Miller	Nikke Nicole	3:50
9.	"We Run Things (It's Like Dat)"	Hanna; Lee; Dillon; Ali Shaheed Muhammad	Ali Shaheed Muhammad	4:11
10.	"Get on Down"	Hanna; Lee; Dillon; Mauldin; Bob Marley; Peter Tosh	Jermaine Dupri	3:38
11.	"Remember We"	Hanna; Lee; Dillon; Matias	J. Prins	4:35
12.	"Clear My Throat (Ya Mammy)"	Hanna; Lee; Dillon; Matias; K. Dillon; Fred Bridges; Richard Knight; Bobby Eaton	J. Prins; Mr. Man (co.)	4:17
13.	"Swing It (Jazziness)"	Hanna; Lee; Dillon; Matias	J. Prins	4:13
Total length:				47:36

Sample credits

- Track 2 contains a sample from "Ring the Alarm" as recorded by Tenor Saw.
- Track 11 contains a sample from "C&H Sugar" written by Hampton Hawes.
- Track 12 contains samples from "Son of a Preacher Man" written by John Hurley and Ronnie Wilkins as recorded by Mongo Santamaría and "You Made a Believer Out of Me" as recorded by Ruby Andrews.
- Track 13 contains a sample from "I Hear a Rhapsody" written by Jack Baker, George Fragos and Dick Gasparre as recorded by John Coltrane.

== Personnel ==
- Acklins "Mr. Man" Dillon – vocals (tracks: 2–6, 8–13), co-producer (tracks: 2, 12)
- Jamahl "Y-Tee" Hanna – vocals (tracks: 2–6, 8–13), co-producer (track 4)
- Harold "Babe-B-Face Kaos" Lee – vocals (tracks: 2–6, 8–13), co-producer (track 4)
- Jermaine Dupri – additional vocals, producer & mixing (tracks: 3, 10)
- Dalili Batson – additional vocals (track 4)
- Tyrone "Chase" Cooper – additional vocals (track 8)
- Sydney Prince – additional vocals (track 8)
- Catfish – live drums (track 4)
- Vincent Henry – saxophone (track 6)
- Leo Colon – piano & bass (track 11)
- Joe "J. Prins" Matias – producer & mixing (tracks: 2, 11–13)
- Mark Batson – producer & mixing (track 4)
- Nicole "Nikke Nikole" Miller – producer & mixing (tracks: 5, 8)
- Leroy Southwell – producer (track 5)
- Salaam Remi Gibbs – producer (track 6)
- Ali Shaheed Muhammad – producer (track 9)
- Don Elliott – engineering (tracks: 2, 12)
- Phil Tan – engineering & mixing (tracks: 3, 10)
- Gregory Mann – engineering (tracks: 4, 12), mixing (tracks: 2, 4)
- Allen Title – engineering & mixing (tracks: 5, 8)
- Eddison Michael Sainsbury – engineering & mixing (track 6)
- Gary Dean Noble – engineering & mixing (track 6)
- Tim Latham – engineering (track 9)
- Gavin Morrison – engineering (track 11)
- Bob Power – mixing (tracks: 9, 13)
- Yoram Vazan – mixing (tracks: 11, 12)
- Carlos Bess – mixing (track 13)
- Nolan Moffitte – engineering assistant (tracks: 2, 11–13)
- Brian Frye – engineering assistant (tracks: 3, 10)
- Djinji Brown – engineering assistant (tracks 4)
- David Carpenter – engineering assistant (tracks 5)
- FatKevneck P. – engineering assistant (tracks 6)
- Robert "Void" Caprio – engineering assistant (tracks 9)
- Steve Clark – engineering assistant (tracks 11)
- Tom Coyne – mastering
- Bart Phillips – executive producer
- Benny Medina – executive producer
- Carolyn Quan – art direction, design
- Kurt Mundahl – photography
- Diane Makowski – A&R
- Paulette White – A&R
- Peter Edge – A&R

== Charts ==
Chart (1994)	Peak position
US Top R&B Albums (Billboard)	83
