= Heavy Metal Maniac =

Studio album by Exciter
- Released: June 14, 1983
- Recorded: August 1982
- Studios: The Dungeon Studios, Aylmer, Quebec
- Genre: Speed metal
- Length: 37:59
- Label: Shrapnel
- Producer: John Belrose

Exciter chronology
Heavy Metal Maniac (1983)	Violence & Force (1984)

Professional ratings
Review scores
Source	Rating
AllMusic	4/5 stars
Collector's Guide to Heavy Metal	6/10

Heavy Metal Maniac is the debut studio album by the Canadian speed metal band Exciter, released through Shrapnel Records in 1983. The album was reissued by Megaforce Records in 2005.

AllMusic stated that while the album is more stylistically "one-dimensional" than similar albums from the era such as Kill 'Em All, this was much less apparent to listeners and critics at the time of its release.

Heavy Metal Maniac was inducted into the Decibel Magazine Hall of Fame in a special issue regarding the Top 100 Old-School Metal Albums of All Time.

== Track listing ==
Side one: Heavy
No.	Title	Writer(s)	Length
1.	"The Holocaust" (Instrumental)	John Ricci, Dan Beehler	1:39
2.	"Stand Up and Fight"	Beehler, Ricci	2:47
3.	"Heavy Metal Maniac"	Ricci, Beehler	3:47
4.	"Iron Dogs"	Beehler, Ricci	5:58
5.	"Mistress of Evil"	Allan Johnson	5:13

Side one: Metal
No.	Title	Writer(s)	Length
6.	"Under Attack"	Richard Beehler, D. Beehler, Ricci	4:17
7.	"Rising of the Dead"	Johnson, Beehler	3:32
8.	"Blackwitch"	Ricci, Beehler	6:59
9.	"Cry of the Banshee"	Johnson, Beehler	3:47
Total length:			37:59

2005 CD edition bonus tracks
No.	Title	Length
10.	"World War III" (Recorded at Nimbus Sound Stage Studios, Toronto, June 1981)	3:41
11.	"Evil Sinner" (Recorded at Pyramid Sound, Ithaca, New York, November 1983)	4:58
12.	"Interview # 1A"	1:36
13.	"Interview # 1B"	7:09
14.	"Interview # 2"	1:41
Total length:		57:04

- Tracks 12 & 13 interviews were recorded on November 7, 1982, on CKCU in Ottawa, Canada.
- Track 14 backstage interview recorded in August 1982 for CHEZ 106 before opening for Black Sabbath at Ottawa Exhibition.

== Credits ==
- Dan Beehler − vocals, drums
- John Ricci − guitar, backing vocals
- Allan Johnson − bass, backing vocals

=== Production ===
- Andy Brown – artwork, concept
