= The Jewels =

American girl group

- Also known as: The Impalas, The Four Jewels
- Origin: Washington, D.C., United States
- Genres: Pop, R&B
- Years active: 1961–1968, 1985
- Past members: Sandra Bears; Grace Ruffin; Margie Clarke (deceased); Carrie Mingo (1961–1963); Martha Harvin (1963–1968)

The Jewels (initially The Impalas, later The Four Jewels) were an American girl group from Washington, D.C., United States.

== Overview ==
The group began singing as The Impalas in 1961; its members had attended Roosevelt High School and sang in Trinity AME Zion Church. Early on the group began performing in Bo Diddley's basement, and Diddley recorded their debut single "I Need You So Much", which was released on Checker Records. The record never caught on, and in 1962 producer Bob Lee changed the group's name to The Four Jewels. The single "Loaded with Goodies" next appeared on Start Records, a local D.C. label, followed by Chess single "That's What They Put Erasers on Pencils For". They also sang backup vocals for member Grace Ruffin's cousin, Billy Stewart. Carrie Mingo left the group around 1963 and was replaced by Martha Harvin; at this time the group became simply The Jewels. The group went on to record for Dynamite Records, Federal, Tec Records, and King over the next few years.

In 1964 the group signed to Dimension Records and released the single "Opportunity". Late in 1964 the tune peaked at #64 on the US Billboard Hot 100 but climbed all the way to #2 on KRLA 1110. This was followed by the single "But I Do" b/w "Smokey Joe", which missed the national charts and marked the end of their association with Dimension. Beginning in 1965, the group toured across the U.S. as backing vocalists with James Brown. They intended to record at Motown Records when the tour stopped in Detroit, but the studios were closed the day they were in town. Brown produced two more singles for the group, but they did not sell, and the group disbanded in 1968.

Martha Harvin changed her stage name to Martha High and went on to tour with Brown for some thirty years, in addition to releasing a solo disco album in 1979. The original four members reunited in 1985 and released an album of their singles re-recorded, entitled Loaded with Goodies. On August 3, 2017, Sandra Bears came onstage for a cameo during a set by the Hall Monitors at Hill Country in Washington, D.C., singing "A Fool in Love" and "Opportunity."

Clarke (born Marjorie Elizabeth Clarke on February 23, 1945) died on September 21, 2019, at age 74.

== Discography ==
=== Albums ===
- Loaded with Goodies (BJM Records, 1985) (credited as the Four Jewels)

=== Singles ===
No.	Title (A-side / B-side)	Label and no.	Year	Peak chart positions	
No.	Title (A-side / B-side)	Label and no.	Year	US Hot 100	US R&B
1	"Loaded with Goodies" b/w "Fire" (credited as the Four Jewels)	Start 638	1962	—	—
2	"Loaded with Goodies" b/w "Dapper Dan" (credited as the Four Jewels)	Checker 1039	1963	—	—
3	"Baby It's You" b/w "She’s Wrong for You Baby" (credited as the Four Jewels)	Tec 3007	1964	—	—
4	"Time for Love" b/w "That's What They Put Erasers on Pencils For"	Checker 1069	1964	—	—
5	"Opportunity" b/w "Gotta Find a Way"	Dimension 1034	1964	64	18
6	"But I Do" b/w "Smokey Joe"	Dimension 1048	1965	—	—
7	"Papa Left Mama Holding the Bag" b/w "This Is My Story"	Dynamite 2000	1965	—	—
8	"This Is My Story" b/w "My Song"	Federal 12541	1966	—	—
9	"Lookie Lookie Lookie" b/w "Smokey Joe's"	King 6068	1967	—	—
10	"Baby Don't You Know" b/w "Never Find a Love like Mine" (credited as the Brownettes)	King 6153	1968	—	—
"—" denotes releases that did not chart.
