= Da Bush Babees =

American hip hop group

- Origin: Brooklyn, New York City, U.S.
- Genres: Hip hop; reggae
- Years active: 1989–1997; 2005–present
- Labels: Reprise; Warner Bros.
- Members: Lord Khaliyl; Lee Majors; Light

Da Bush Babees is an American hip-hop trio loosely affiliated with the Native Tongues. The members of the group originally performed under the stage names Babe-B-Face Kaos (later Lee Majors), Mister Man (later King Khaliyl) and Y-Tee (later Light).

The three grew up in Jamaica and Trinidad, where reggae strongly influenced their style. The group was formed in 1992 in Brooklyn, where Mister Man first saw Kaos perform. The two began collaborating, and after Mister Man suggested adding a reggae toaster, Y-Tee joined the group. After their early concert dates attracted major-label interest, the trio performed live office auditions and signed with Reprise three months after launching the group. Their first album, Ambushed (1994), featured production from Jay Matias, Ali Shaheed Muhammad, Salaam Gibbs (later known as Salaam Remi) and the group itself, among others. Later releases included "Remember We" in 1995 and their 1996 second album Gravity, which was the group's first underground and commercial success. Its lead single, "The Love Song", was produced by Posdnuos of De La Soul; that single also featured a then-unknown Mos Def singing the chorus, who also sang the chorus and rapped the third verse of the album's seventh track, "S.O.S".

Da Bush Babees have resumed performing under the name Dub Rock All-Stars and are currently in the process of finalizing an as-yet untitled album. Their most recent performance was May 23, 2012 at the Lyricist Lounge 20 Year Reunion Party at (le) Poisson Rouge in New York City. Also gracing the stage along with Da Bush Babees, were classic Hip-Hop powerhouses Doug E. Fresh, Kid Capri, Black Thought of The Roots, Prodigy of Mobb Deep, Mos Def, Pharoahe Monch and many others.

Mr. Man later changed his nickname to Mr. Khaliyl, and later to Lord Khaliyl, and went on to produce for other artists, and he also released a rare 12-inch single on Rawkus featuring Talib Kweli, Pharoahe Monch and DCQ. Mr. Man has also more recently produced for such artists as Rasco, Res and Fabolous, among others.

== Discography ==
=== Albums ===
- Ambushed (1994)
- Gravity (1996)
