= Give Me Some Skin =

Single by James Brown and The J.B.'s

from the album Mutha's Nature
- B-side: "People Wake Up and Live"
- Released: 1977
- Genre: Funk, disco
- Length: 3:56
- Label: Polydor; 14409
- Songwriters: Deanna Brown; Yammer Brown
- Producer: James Brown

James Brown charting singles chronology
"Kiss in 77" (1977)	"Give Me Some Skin" (1977)	""If You Don't Give a Dogone About It (B-side of "People Who Criticize")" (1977)

Audio video
- "Give Me Some Skin" on YouTube

"Give Me Some Skin" is a song written and performed by James Brown. Released as a single in 1977, it peaked at No. 20 on the Billboard R&B chart. It also appeared on the album Mutha's Nature.
