= Bodyheat (album) =

Studio album by James Brown
- Released: December 1976
- Recorded: May 3, 1972 ("Woman"); July – August 1976 (remainder of titles)
- Studio: A & R (New York City, New York); Criteria (Miami, Florida)
- Genre: Funk; R&B; soul
- Length: 34:37
- Label: Polydor; 6093
- Producer: James Brown

James Brown chronology
Get Up Offa That Thing (1976)	Bodyheat (1976)	Mutha's Nature (1977)

Singles from Bodyheat
- 1. "Bodyheat" Released: December 1976; 2. "Kiss in '77 / Woman" Released: April 1977

Professional ratings
Review scores
Source	Rating
AllMusic	2/5 stars
Robert Christgau	C
The Rolling Stone Album Guide	2/5 stars

Bodyheat is the 44th studio album by American musician James Brown. The album was released in December 1976, by Polydor Records. It includes the singles "Bodyheat" and "Kiss in '77". It was produced and arranged by James Brown. The cover and art work was by the Virginia Team.

The back of the cover features a text written by James Brown titled "Brand New Sound".

"Sometimes the serpent of the devil is
so strong, it takes the bodyheat of
God to keep him away. So do good,
think good and you'll be good to your
fellow man- and to all humanity.

Listen to this album. Not only will the
spiritual feeling get to you, but the
'groove' will, too.

Undying Dedication To You,
JAMES BROWN
(With the feeling of a new
beginning... A New Sound!)"

== Track listing ==
Side one
No.	Title	Written By	Length
1.	"Bodyheat"	Deanna Brown, Deidra Brown, Yamma Brown	9:03
2.	"Woman"	James Brown	5:55
3.	"Kiss in '77"	"Sweet" Charles Sherrell	4:50

Side two
No.	Title	Written By	Length
1.	"I'm Satisfied"	Deanna Brown, Deidra Brown, Yamma Brown	4:50
2.	"What the World Needs Now Is Love"	Burt Bacharach, Hal David	4:13
3.	"Wake Up and Give Yourself a Chance"	Deanna Brown, Deidra Brown, Yamma Brown	3:44
4.	"Don't Tell It"	Deanna Brown, Deidra Brown, Yamma Brown	3:57

== Personnel ==
- James Brown – lead vocals, arrangement

The J.B.'s

- various bandmembers – backing vocals
- Russell Crimes – trumpet
- Hollie Farris – valve trombone
- Joe Poff – alto saxophone, flute
- St. Clair Pinckney, Peyton "P.J." Johnson – tenor saxophone
- Mike Lawler – clavinet, keyboards
- Jimmy Nolen – electric guitar
- "Sweet" Charles Sherrell – bass guitar
- Johnny Griggs – congas
- Melvin Parker – drums

Studio band arranged by Sammy Lowe on "Woman"

- Lew Soloff – trumpet
- Joe Farrell – tenor saxophone
- Richard Tee – piano, electric organ
- Hugh McCracken – electric guitar
- Gordon Edwards – bass guitar
- Bernard "Pretty" Purdie – drums
