= Sa-Deuce (album) =

Studio album by Sa-Deuce
- Released: March 26, 1996
- Recorded: 1995–1996
- Genre: R&B, hip hop
- Label: East West
- Producer: EZ Elpee, Darryl McClary & Michael Allen, Meleick Britt & Deconzo Smith

Sa-Deuce is the self-titled first and only album by R&B group, Sa-Deuce. It was released on March 26, 1996, by East West Records. The album peaked at No. 79 on the Billboard Top R&B/Hip-Hop Albums chart, and the album's lead single "Don't Waste My Time" peaked at No. 42 on the Hot R&B/Hip-Hop Singles & Tracks chart.

== Track listing ==
1. "Can't Get You Off My Mind"
2. "Don't Waste My Time"
3. "Just Can't Live Without Your Love"
4. "Don't Take Your Love Away"
5. "Go Down"
6. "Ordinary People" (featuring Michael Speaks)
7. "Born In"
8. "One Man Woman"
9. "Body Knockin'"
10. "Full Time Lover"
11. "Does She"
