= Sa-Deuce =

American R&B group

Sa-Deuce was an American R&B group composed of Janai Abercrombie and Paula Asiah Pierre-Louis. They were signed to Eastwest Records. Their first release came in 1995 with the single "Don't Waste My Time", which reached No. 42 on the Billboard Hot R&B/Hip-Hop Singles & Tracks chart. On March 26, 1996, Eastwest Records released the group's self-titled debut album, which peaked at No. 79 on the Top R&B/Hip-Hop Albums chart. In 1996 the track peaked at #40 in the New Zealand top 50 singles

== Discography ==
- 1996: Sa-Deuce
