= I Refuse to Lose =

Single by James Brown

from the album Get Up Offa That Thing
- B-side: "Home Again"
- Released: 1976
- Genre: Funk
- Length: 3:42
- Label: Polydor; 14354
- Songwriter(s): Deidre Brown; Deanna Brown; Yamma Brown
- Producer(s): James Brown

James Brown charting singles chronology
| "Get Up Offa That Thing" (1976) | "I Refuse to Lose" (1976) | "Bodyheat (Part 1)" (1976) |

Audio video
- "I Refuse To Lose" on YouTube

"I Refuse to Lose" is a song recorded by James Brown. Released as a single in 1976, it charted #47 R&B. It also appeared on the album Get Up Offa That Thing.
