= Unveiling the Wicked =

Studio album by Exciter
- Released: 1986
- Recorded: December 1985
- Studio: Britannia Row Studios, London
- Genre: Speed metal, heavy metal
- Length: 43:29
- Label: Music for Nations
- Producer: Guy Bidmead

Exciter chronology
Long Live the Loud (1985)	Unveiling the Wicked (1986)	Exciter (1988)

Professional ratings
Review scores
Source	Rating
AllMusic	4/5 stars
Collector's Guide to Heavy Metal	5/10

Unveiling the Wicked is the fourth studio album by Canadian speed metal band Exciter, released through Music for Nations in 1986 and reissued through Megaforce Records in 2005. This was the first album without the original guitarist John Ricci, who was replaced by Brian McPhee.

== Track listing ==
All songs written by Dan Beehler, Allan Johnson, and Brian McPhee.

Side one: Heavy
No.	Title	Length
1.	"Break Down the Walls"	6:39
2.	"Brainstorm"	1:32
3.	"Die in the Night"	4:12
4.	"(I Hate) School Rules"	3:57
5.	"Shout It Out"	4:40

Side two: Metal
No.	Title	Length
6.	"Invasion / Waiting in the Dark"	5:41
7.	"Living Evil"	6:59
8.	"Live Fast, Die Young"	3:54
9.	"Mission Destroy"	5:55

== Personnel ==
=== Exciter ===
- Dan Beehler − lead vocals, drums
- Brian McPhee − guitar, backing vocals
- Allan Johnson – bass, backing vocals

=== Production ===
- Guy Bidmead – producer, engineer
- Graham Meek – assistant engineer
