= Long Live the Loud =

Studio album by Exciter
- Released: June 1985
- Recorded: February 1985
- Studio: Britannia Row Studios, London
- Genre: Speed metal
- Length: 41:22
- Label: Music for Nations
- Producer: Guy Bidmead

Exciter chronology
Violence & Force (1984)	Long Live the Loud (1985)	Unveiling the Wicked (1986)

Professional ratings
Review scores
Source	Rating
AllMusic	4.5/5 stars
Collector's Guide to Heavy Metal	4/10

Long Live the Loud is the third studio album by the Canadian speed metal band Exciter, released through Music for Nations in 1985 and re-released through Megaforce Records in March 2005 with the EP Feel the Knife. This was the last Exciter album to feature guitarist John Ricci until 1992's Kill After Kill.

== Track listing ==
All songs were written by Dan Beehler, except "Victims of Sacrifice" by Allan Johnson and Beehler.

Side one: Heavy
No.	Title	Length
1.	"Fall Out"	1:55
2.	"Long Live the Loud"	4:18
3.	"I Am the Beast"	4:50
4.	"Victims of Sacrifice"	4:59
5.	"Beyond the Gates of Doom"	5:15

Side two: Metal
No.	Title	Length
6.	"Sudden Impact"	4:03
7.	"Born to Die"	6:02
8.	"Wake Up Screaming"	10:00

=== 2005 CD edition bonus tracks ===
No.	Title	Length
9.	"Feel the Knife"	2:55
10.	"Violence and Force" (live)	4:24
11.	"Pounding Metal" (live)	6:14

== Personnel ==
=== Exciter ===
- Dan Beehler − lead vocals, drums
- John Ricci − guitar, backing vocals
- Allan Johnson – bass, backing vocals

=== Production ===
- Guy Bidmead – producer, engineer
- Laura Boisseau – assistant engineer
- Alan Craddock – artwork
