= Eyesight (song) =

Single by James Brown

from the album Jam/1980's
- B-side: "I Never, Never, Never Will Forget"
- Released: 1978
- Genre: Funk, disco
- Length: 3:21; 5:30 (album version)
- Label: Polydor; 14465
- Songwriter(s): James Brown; Deidre Brown
- Producer(s): James Brown

James Brown charting singles chronology
"If You Don't Give a Dogone About It" (1977)	"Eyesight" (1978)	"The Spank" (1978)

Audio video
- "Eyesight" on YouTube

"Eyesight" is a song written and performed by James Brown. Released as a single in 1978, it charted #38 R&B. It also appeared on Brown's 1978 album Jam/1980's.
