= Hellish Crossfire =

Studio album by Iron Angel
- Released: July 1985
- Recorded: Caet Studio, Berlin, Germany, May 1985
- Genre: Speed metal
- Length: 41:19
- Label: SPV GmbH
- Producer: Horst Muller

Iron Angel chronology
Hellish Crossfire (1985)	Winds of War (1986)

Professional ratings
Review scores
Source	Rating
AllMusic	4/5 stars

Hellish Crossfire is the debut album by German speed metal band Iron Angel, released in 1985 through SPV GmbH.

The music and lyrical content on Hellish Crossfire is considered to be Satanic. Incorporating elements of thrash metal, the sound has been compared to Helloween and early Slayer. Some publications consider the album to be an underrated release in the genre, though the album's cover artwork has been retroactively mocked.

== Music and lyrics ==
Eduardo Rivadavia of AllMusic said that Hellish Crossfire "contained an explosive mix of speed and thrash metal that generally avoided the uncompromising black metal-tinged direction preferred by Kreator, Sodom, and their ilk, to embrace the melodic power metal-leaning style also championed by Helloween." Revolver called the album "a Satanic riff-storm in the spirit of Slayer’s Hell Awaits, with appropriately brimstone-choked lyrics."

== Artwork ==
Simon Young of Kerrang! said the album's cover artwork "features the four types of people you’ll see waiting for a taxi in any provincial town at closing time."

== Reception and legacy ==
Eduardo Rivadavia of AllMusic gave Hellish Crossfire four stars out of five. He said the album "is a living testament to the wild, untamed excitement that fueled the first wave of German thrash metal bands, of which the Hamburg quintet had been one of the earliest contenders. Quite like the first mini-album from crosstown rivals Helloween released that same year, Hellish Crossfire brewed up potent speed metal that was certainly a little rough around the edges, but excusably so given the band's sheer enthusiasm and boundless, youthful energy while delivering it."

In 2020, J. Bennett of Revolver included the album on his list of "10 Criminally Underrated 80s Thrash Albums". He wrote: "Though they didn’t have the staying power of Germany’s Big Three, Hamburg’s Iron Angel dropped a crucial slab of Teutonic thrash with their 1985 debut."

In 2021, Simon Young of Kerrang! included the album in an article naming "50 of the worst album covers ever".

== Track listing ==
Side - Iron
No.	Title	Lyrics	Music	Length
1.	"The Metallian"	Matthes	Strüven, Wittke	4:17
2.	"Sinner 666"	Matthes	Wittke	2:50
3.	"Black Mass"	Matthes	Wittke	5:48
4.	"The Church of the Lost Souls"	Matthes	Strüven	3:11
5.	"Hunter in Chains"	Matthes, Berg	Strüven	4:37

Side - Angel
No.	Title	Lyrics	Music	Length
6.	"Rush of Power"	Matthes	Strüven, Wittke	3:25
7.	"Legions of Evil"	Matthes	Wittke, Strüven	4:53
8.	"Wife of the Devil"	Berg	Wittke	3:48
9.	"Nightmare"	Matthes	Wittke	5:25
10.	"Heavy Metal Soldiers"	Matthes	Strüven	3:05

The 2004 and 2014 CD re-issues contains the 1984 Power Metal Attack demo

No.	Title	Length
1.	"Open the Gate/Devil's Gate"	4:59
2.	"Rush of Power"	3:37
3.	"Maniac of the Night"	4:35
4.	"Sea of Flames"	3:07
5.	"Wife of the Devil"	4:07
6.	"Hounds of Hell"	6:29

== Personnel ==
Band members

- Dirk Schröder - vocals
- Peter Wittke - guitars
- Sven Strüven - guitars
- Thorsten Lohmann - bass
- Mike Matthes - drums

Production

- Uwe Karczewski - cover art
- Edda Karczewski - artwork
- Horst "Hoddle" Müller - production
- Joachim Peters-Schnee - photography
