= Iron Angel =

German heavy metal band

- Origin: Hamburg, Germany
- Genres: Speed metal, power metal, heavy metal
- Years active: 1983–1986, 1997–2007, 2014–2023
- Label: Mighty Music
- Past members: Dirk Schröder; Thorsten Lohmann; Mike Matthes; Peter "Piet" Wittke; Sven Strüven; Günther Moritz; Alexander "Schrotti" Kokatt; Joachim Folta; Mitsch Meyer; Robert Altenbach; Nino Helfrich; Didy Mackel; Maximilian Behr

Iron Angel was a German heavy metal band from Hamburg.

== History ==
=== Early years, reunion and split (1983–1986, 1997–2007) ===
The band's origins go back to 1980, when drummer Mike Matthes and bassist Thorsten Lohmann were in a band called Metal Gods, named after the Judas Priest song. In 1983, they formed their own band with guitarists Peter Wittke and Sven Strüven. They recruited vocalist Dirk Schröder. The band was named Iron Angel, inspired by a novel about a spirit hunter. The band recorded three demos in 1984 and signed to SPV/Steamhammer. Their debut album, Hellish Crossfire, was released in 1985, received critical acclaim, and became known in the German speed metal scene. In 1986, Lohmann departed the band and was replaced with Günther Moritz for a German tour with King Diamond. The next album, Winds of War, was released in June 1986. The album's style differred from its predecessor. The members debated about the band's musical direction, which rose tensions until mid 1986. Iron Angel disbanded.

After a jam session with Peter Wittke, Dirk Schröder, and Mike Matthes, Iron Angel reformed in 1997 as a four-piece band, with new member Günther Moritz. They were recording a potential third album titled The Rebirth, after which they would begin work on a fourth album to be titled Vier. In 2000, Wittke died in a car accident and Moritz left the band, precluding either album from being released. Schröder and Matthes self-released the demo Back from Hell was in May 2007. It was consisted of potential material for their intended comeback album from the early 2000s. The band disbanded again that year, as they could not find suitable new members. In 2008, guitarist Sven Strüven died.

=== Second reformation (2014–2023) ===
In October 2014, Iron Angel reformed with a full lineup. They performed at the Headbangers Open Air and in South America in 2015, and at the Metal Magic Festival in 2016. In 2017, the band recorded their third studio album and first in 32 years, Hellbound, released on 4 May 2018. To support the album, they toured Europe, North and South America, and Japan, headlining most of their shows.

The fourth album, Emerald Eyes, was released on 2 October 2020. Due to the COVID-19 pandemic, the band were unable to tour in support of the album.

On 27 May 2022, Iron Angel performed their final show at the Bavarian Battle Open Air in Kirchdorf. On 27 May 2023, the band announced their inactive status.

On 28 March 2025, vocalist Dirk Schröder died at the age of 58.

== Musical style and influences ==
Iron Angel's musical approach is influenced by bands such as Motörhead, Slayer and Judas Priest, according to former drummer Mike Matthes, "We wanted to try to connect speed metal with melodic elements, what was not asked at the time yet, unfortunately, but later it was done by bands like Helloween and then was also accepted by the fans. I am also of the opinion that we were not a thrash metal band, but a speed metal one." He then recalled a show in Belgium where Kreator vocalist/guitarist Mille Petrozza told Matthes that Iron Angel was "the worst thrash metal band, but the best speed metal band from Germany."

== Band members ==
Final members

- Dirk Schröder – vocals (1983–1986, 1997–2007, 2014–2023) (died 2025)
- Robert Altenbach – guitars (2016–2023)
- Maximilian Behr – drums (2017–2023)

Former members

- Thorsten Lohmann – bass (1983–1986)
- Mike Matthes – drums (1983–1986, 1997–2007, 2014–2015), bass, guitars (2000–2007)
- Peter "Piet" Wittke – guitars (1983–1986, 1997–2000) (died 2000)
- Sven Strüven – guitars (1983–1986) (died 2008)
- Günther Moritz – bass (1997–2000)
- Alexander "Schrotti" Kokatt – drums (2015–2017)
- Joachim Folta – guitars (2014–2016)
- Mitsch Meyer – guitars (2014–2019)
- Didy Mackel – bass (2014–2022)
- Nino Helfrich – guitars (2019–2022)

Live musicians

- Günther Moritz – bass (1986)

== Discography ==
- Power Metal Attack (demo 1984)
- Legions of Evil (demo 1984)
- Hellish Crossfire (1985)
- Winds of War (1986)
- Rush of Power (2000) – first demo on LP
- The Tapes (2004) – live 1986, Germany Tour with King Diamond
- Rush of Power (2004) – live 1985 Warpke Open Air
- Back from Hell (demo 2007)
- Hellbound (2018)
- Emerald Eyes (2020)
