= If You Don't Give a Doggone About It =

"If You Don't Give a Dogone About It"

Single by James Brown and The New J.B.'s

from the album Mutha's Nature
- A-side: "People Who Criticize"
- Released: 1977
- Genre: Funk, disco
- Length: 3:07
- Label: Polydor; 14438
- Songwriter(s): James Brown; Deanna Brown
- Producer(s): James Brown

James Brown charting singles chronology
"Give Me Some Skin" (1977)	"If You Don't Give a Dogone About It" (1977)	"Eyesight" (1978)

Audio video
- "If You Don't Give A Dogone About It" on YouTube

"If You Don't Give a Doggone about it" (spelled "Dogone" in its original release) is a song written and performed by James Brown. Issued as the B-side of Brown's 1977 single "People Who Criticize", it charted #45 R&B. It also appeared on the album Mutha's Nature.
