= Bodyheat =

1976 song by James Brown

"Bodyheat (Part 1)"

Single by James Brown

from the album Bodyheat
- B-side: "Bodyheat (Part 2)"
- Released: December 1976
- Recorded: September 1976, International Studios, Augusta, GA
- Genre: Disco, funk
- Length: 4:05 (Part 1); 4:39 (Part 2)
- Label: Polydor; 14360
- Songwriter(s): Deidra Brown; Deanna Brown; Yamma Brown
- Producer(s): James Brown

James Brown charting singles chronology
"I Refuse to Lose" (1976)	"Bodyheat (Part 1)" (1976)	"Kiss in 77" (1977)

Audio video
- "Bodyheat" on YouTube

"Bodyheat" (sometimes spelled "Body Heat") is a song recorded by James Brown. It was released in 1976 as a two-part single on Polydor Records and also appeared on an album of the same name. It charted #13 R&B and #88 Pop. It was Brown's last song to appear on the Billboard Hot 100 until "Living in America" in 1985.

Live performances of the song appear on the albums Hot on the One (1980) and Live in New York (1981). An alternate mix of the studio version was included as a bonus track on the 2003 reissue of Motherlode.
