= Exciter (band) =

Canadian speed metal band

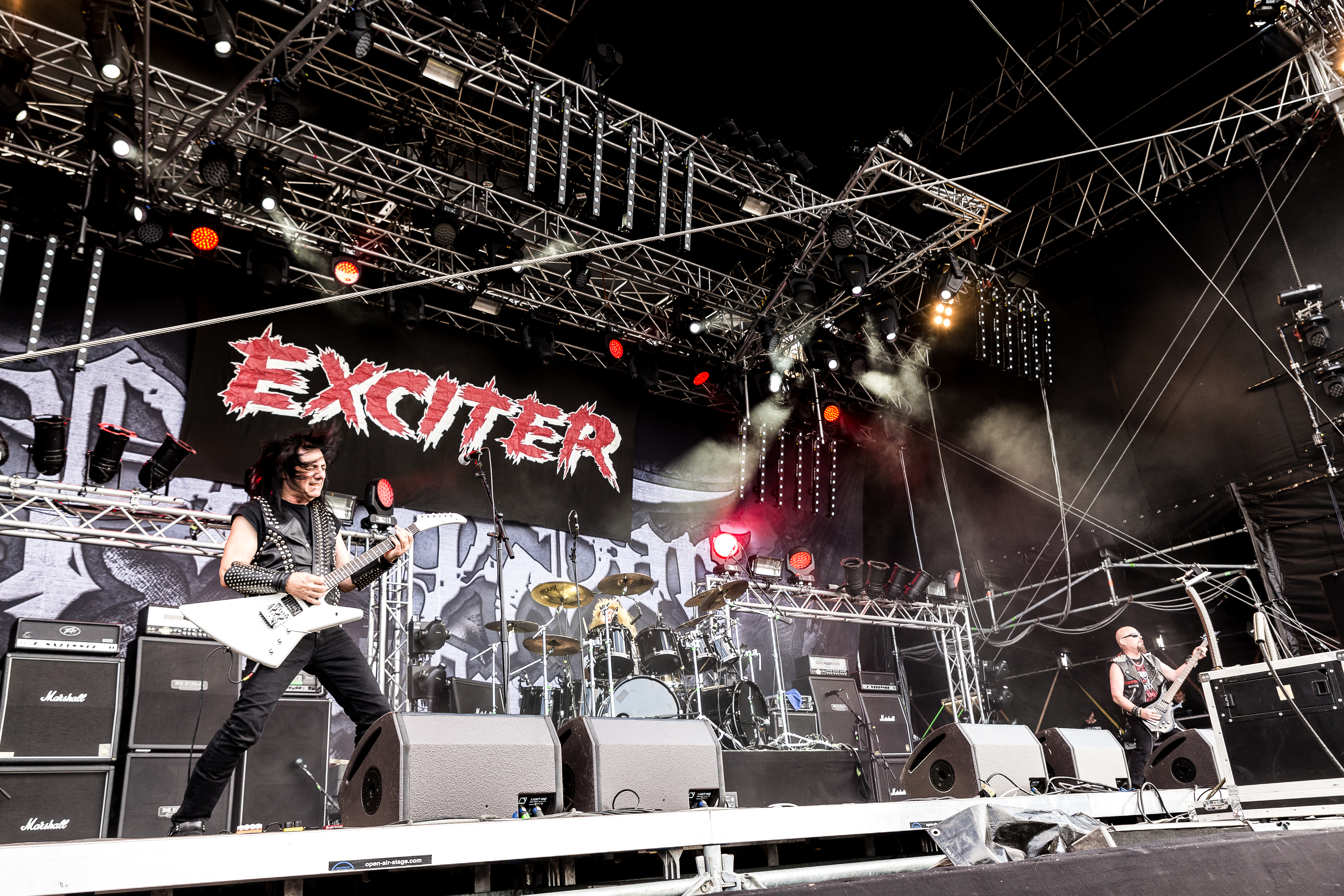
- Exciter performing in 2018

Background information
- Also known as: Hell Razor (1978–1980)
- Origin: Ottawa, Ontario, Canada
- Genres: Speed metal; thrash metal; heavy metal
- Years active: 1978–1989; 1991–1993; 1996–2026
- Labels: Megaforce; Osmose; Massacre; Noise; Maze Music; Music for Nations; Shrapnel
- Members: Daniel Dekay; Dan Beehler; Allan James Johnson
- Past members: John Ricci; Rob Malnati; Brian McPhee; David Ledden; Jeff McDonald; Marc Charron; Jacques Belanger; Kenny "Metal Mouth" Winter; Rob "Clammy" Cohen; Rik Charron
- Website: longlivetheloud.com
- Logo
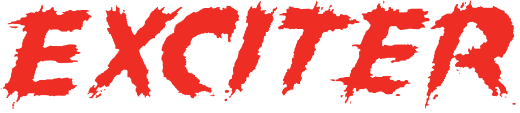

Exciter was a Canadian speed metal band formed in Ottawa, Ontario, in 1978. Named after a Judas Priest song, they are considered one of the first speed metal bands, and cited as an influence on thrash metal. Through personnel changes and three disbandments (in 1989, 1993, and 2026), Exciter has enjoyed limited commercial success.

== History ==
=== Formation and "classic" lineup era (1978–1985) ===
In 1978, the band Hell Razor formed in Ottawa, Ontario. It consisted of vocalist and drummer Dan Beehler, guitarist John Ricci, and bassist Allan James Johnson. In 1980, the band changed their name to Exciter and recorded a demo which they then sent to Mike Varney of Shrapnel Records. Varney included one song from it, "World War III", on the compilation album US Metal Volume II in 1982. Shortly after that, the band was signed to Shrapnel. In 1983, they released their debut album, Heavy Metal Maniac.

Exciter signed a record deal with Jon Zazula's Megaforce Records the year after based on the promise of tour support and, in 1984, released their second album, Violence & Force. After a few headlining dates with American thrash metal band Anthrax, they embarked on their first U.S. tour with Danish heavy metal band Mercyful Fate opening for Motörhead. Exciter was forced to switch to a new label, Music for Nations, when Megaforce sold its contract and travelled to London, England for a tour that was cancelled at the last minute and then again to record their third album, Long Live the Loud. It was released in 1985 and produced by Motörhead producer Guy Bidmead. It contained a slightly more "mainstream" heavy metal sound than the pure speed/thrash metal of the first two albums. After its release, the band went on a European tour with German heavy metal band Accept. At the end of 1984, Exciter was the support band on one of the US legs of Motörhead's No Remorse Tour; the following year, they were the headliner in a tour with Megadeth and Exodus. Before the year ended, Exciter released the three-track EP, Feel the Knife, which was the last release from the original line-up. Shortly after its release, John Ricci left the band and was replaced by Brian McPhee.

=== Lineup changes, first hiatus and first comeback (1986–1996) ===
Along with a new guitarist came a new, more melodic sound. The band's fourth album, Unveiling the Wicked, was released in 1986 on the Music for Nations label. After its release, the band went out on a successful European tour with Motörhead and American power metal band Manowar. It was decided at this time that Dan Beehler (who had handled both drums and vocals since the band's inception) would not sing anymore. New vocalist Rob Malnati was hired, and made his debut on the band's self-titled album (a.k.a. O.T.T.). The album was released in 1988 through the Canadian record label Maze Music. A Canadian tour followed, but by early 1989, the band had broken up.

In 1991, Exciter re-emerged with Beehler on lead vocals again. John Ricci also returned to the band. Bass duties were handled by new bassist David Ledden. The band's first recording with this line-up was the song "Born to Kill" which appeared on a compilation album titled Capitol Punishment, which was released in 1991. The same year, the band went on a reunion tour in Canada, which would largely be focused on songs from their first three albums. The band's first live album, Better Live than Dead, which was released in 1993, had been recorded during their reunion tour at this time.

In 1992, the band signed to German metal label Noise Records and recorded their sixth album, Kill After Kill. The band went on a three-week European tour with Rage to support it. After the tour, the band disappeared for a second time. It would be three years before they would be heard from again.

=== Second reunion and Jacques Bélanger era (1996–2006) ===
In March 1996, an almost completely new line-up was announced. Ricci was the only returning original member. Jacques Bélanger was the new vocalist and Rik Charron and Marc Charron (no relation) would handle drum and bass duties respectively. The new line-up played a few well-received gigs in Canada before recording a new album, The Dark Command. The album was released in 1997. With one of their strongest albums in years, the band went out on a European tour with Anvil and Flotsam and Jetsam.

Between 1998 and 2000, the band was basically dormant with only two festival appearances in the two-year span. The summer of 2000 saw the release of the follow-up album to The Dark Command, Blood of Tyrants. The new album was heavier and more aggressive than its predecessor. In the fall of 2001, Bélanger left the band due to "creative differences". A year later Marc Charron quit, pursuing a career in the technology industry.

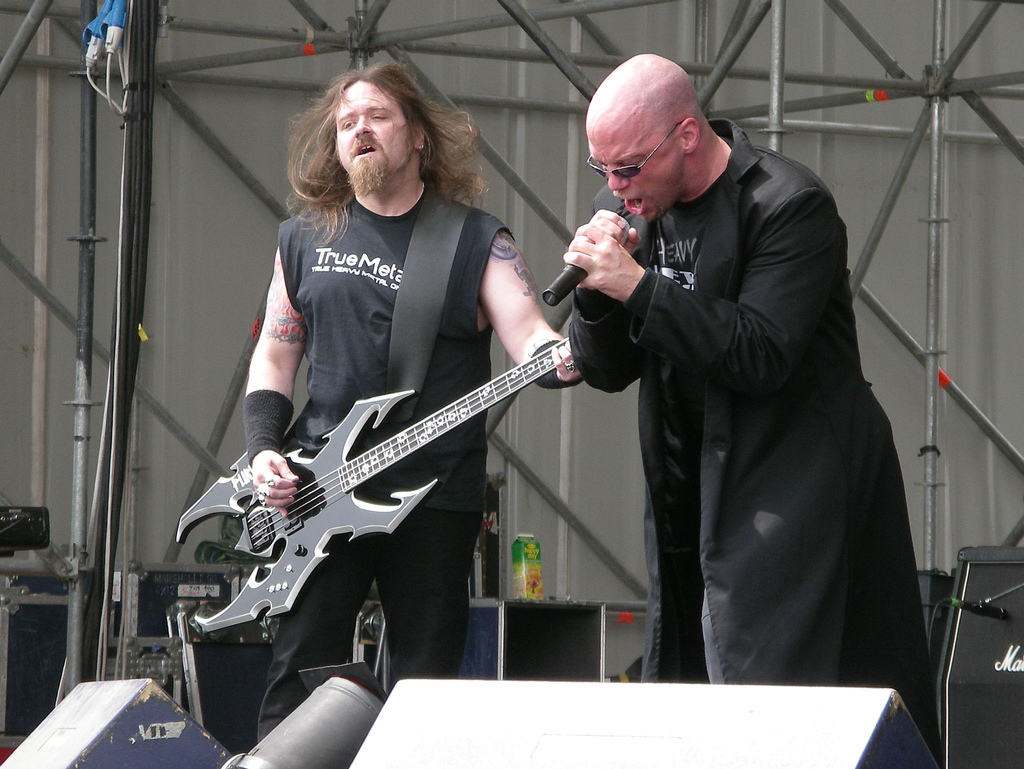
Jacques Belanger and Rob Cohen performing with Exciter in 2005

At the beginning of 2003, a new line-up was announced, with Ricci and Rik Charron returning along with new vocalist Rob Degroot and new bassist Paul Champagne. This line-up only lasted until March 2003 when Degroot left. His replacement was former vocalist Jacques Bélanger. In 2004, Paul Champagne was released from the band. The band recorded their ninth studio album, New Testament, with Ricci on both guitar and bass. New Testament is somewhat of a compilation album of re-recorded classics from throughout the band's entire career. Later that year, bassist Rob "Clammy" Cohen joined the ranks. The year ended with the band heading out on a European tour with Swedish power metal band Steel Attack.

Exciter participated in a number of European summer festivals in 2005, including the Tradate Iron Fest in Italy, Bang Your Head in Germany and Metalcamp in Slovenia.

Annihilator founder Jeff Waters was able to get the rights back to most of Exciter's catalogue titles from the old labels and get them a new deal to re-release these titles. As well, Waters remastered these titles and new booklet info, including comments from the original 3 band members, as well as additional photos were added to the re-releases.

=== Kenny "Metal Mouth" Winter era (2006–2014) ===
In 2006, Exciter played Keep It True VI in Lauda-Königshofen, Germany. Shortly thereafter, Bélanger left once again. An official statement from the band stated that "Due to 'differences of opinion' on many issues between Jacques and the rest of the band, he felt he could no longer continue as vocalist for Exciter." This lead them to regrettably cancel upcoming shows in Europe, the US and Canada that they had been working on for the summer. He was quickly replaced in October of that year by Kenny "Metal Mouth" Winter from New York.

The band played only one headlining show in Toronto, Canada in August 2007, thanks to an intense rehearsal and recording schedule involving a weekly 23-hour trek from New York City to Ottawa by Kenny Winter.

Twice delayed in December 2007 and January 2008, the band's tenth album Thrash Speed Burn was released in February 2008 in Europe and in March 2008 worldwide. It has since garnered positive reviews from many a European fanzine.

The band's first European show for the tour, with the then-current line-up, saw their debut at the Atarfe Vega Rock Festival in Granada, Spain. Coincidentally, it also marked Exciter's first-ever appearance on the Iberian Peninsula.

=== Reunion with "classic" line-up and third breakup (2014–2026) ===
In February 2014, it was announced on the band's official Facebook fan page that guitarist John Ricci had decided to leave the band, departing Exciter and leaving the band with no original members. In April 2014, Ricci began claiming that the retirement statement was false, however the former band members maintain that at the time of the press release, the information it contained was accurate.

The original Exciter line-up reunited shortly after, playing their first European show on April 25, 2015, at Keep It True Festival and then in March 2015 at the Defenders of the Old Festival in New York. A reunion album was planned for 2019, but remained in question after the departure of John Ricci. In October 2018, Daniel Dekay was announced as the replacement for Ricci. The band also had a new album in the works.

In a March 2026 interview with Brave Words & Bloody Knuckles, Johnson confirmed that Exciter was "dead and buried and put to rest" after "a year and a half and no contact" with Beehler.

== Legacy and influences ==
Some publications such as Loudwire consider Exciter to be among the greatest heavy metal acts to come out of Canada. Their first two albums were highly influential on the thrash movement that would come shortly afterward.

Exciter's music has been influenced by, amongst others, AC/DC, Black Sabbath, Deep Purple, Grand Funk Railroad, Iron Maiden, Jethro Tull, Judas Priest, Motörhead, Rush and Scorpions.

== Band members ==
=== Final lineup ===
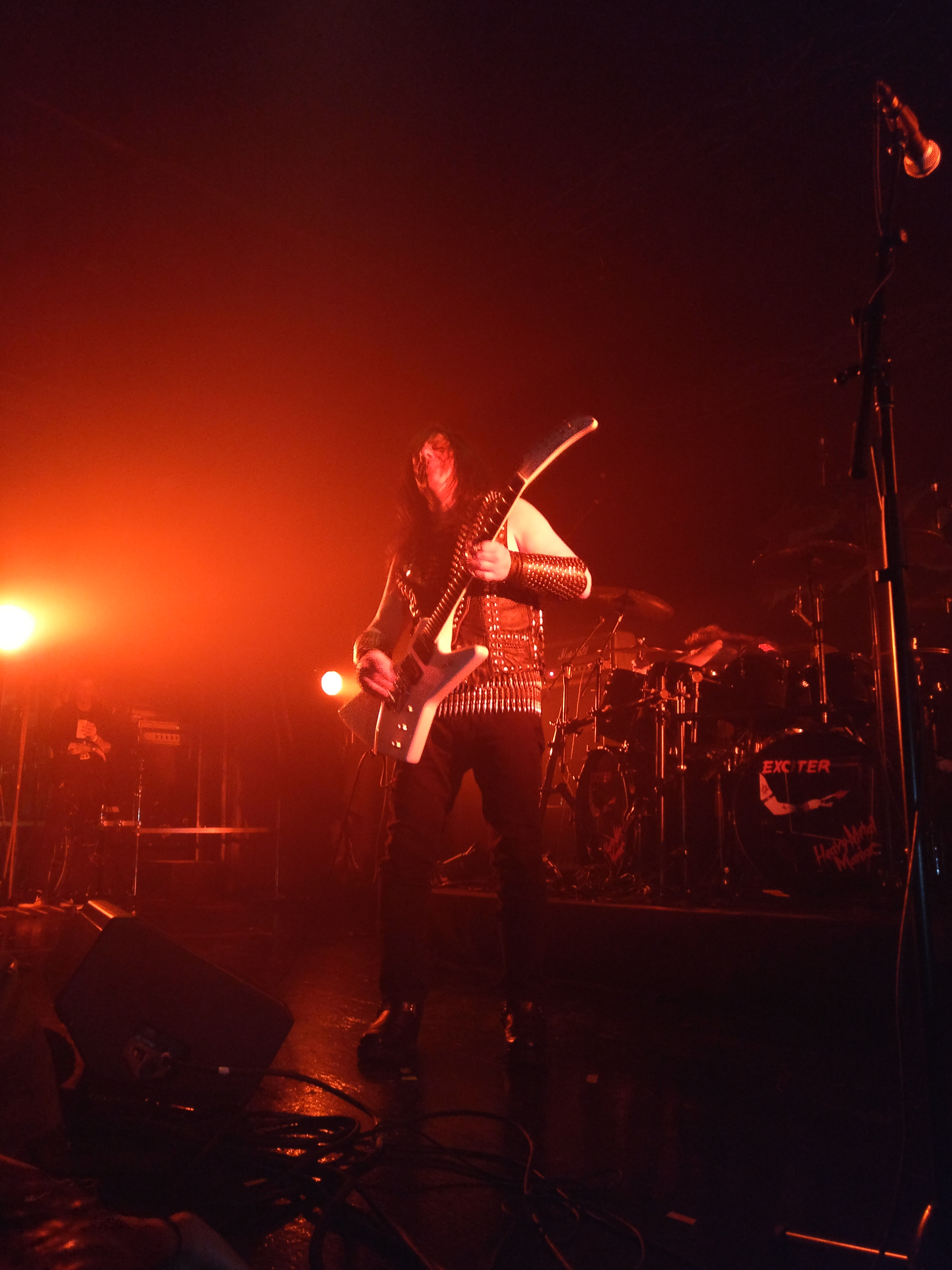
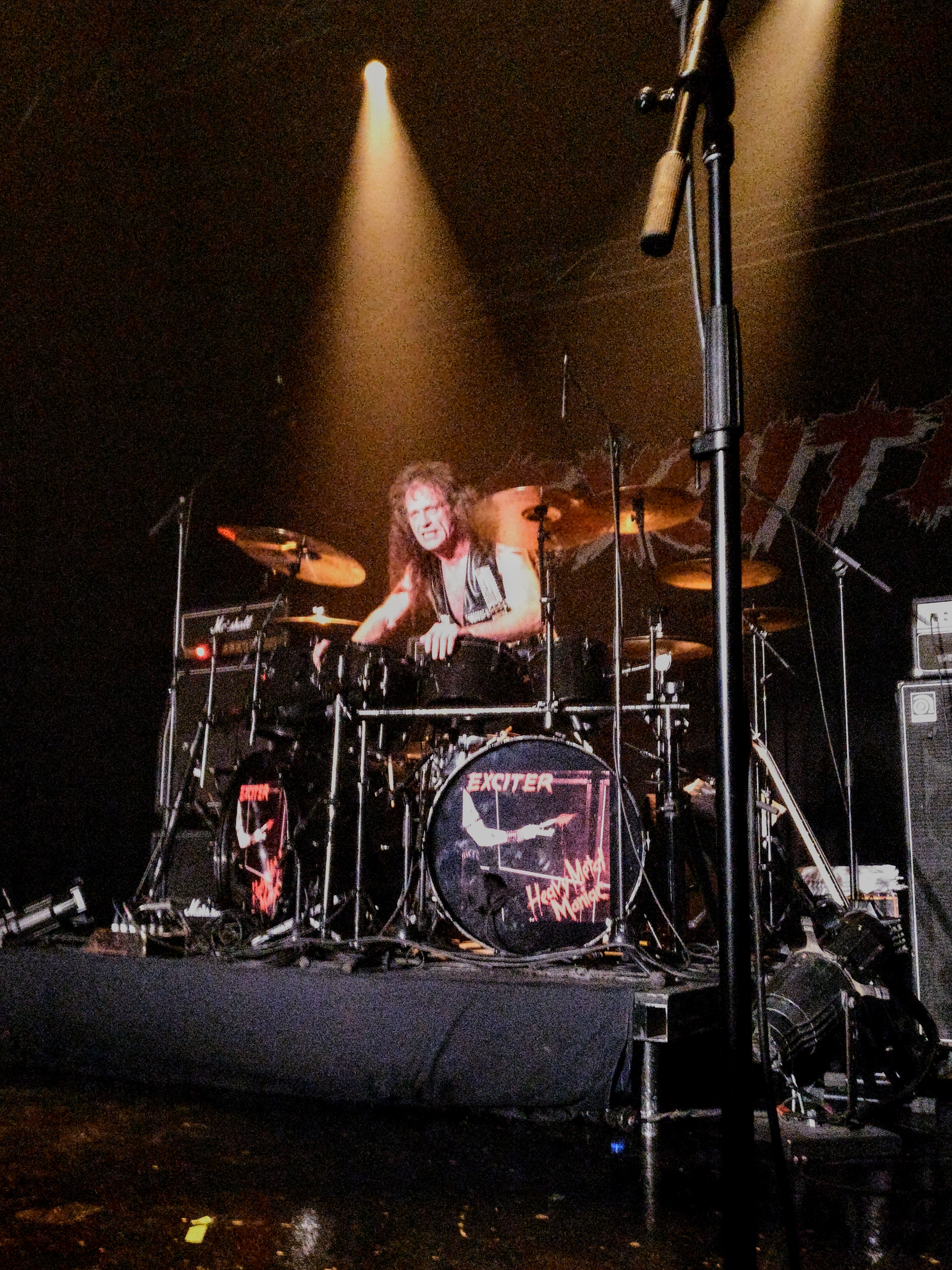
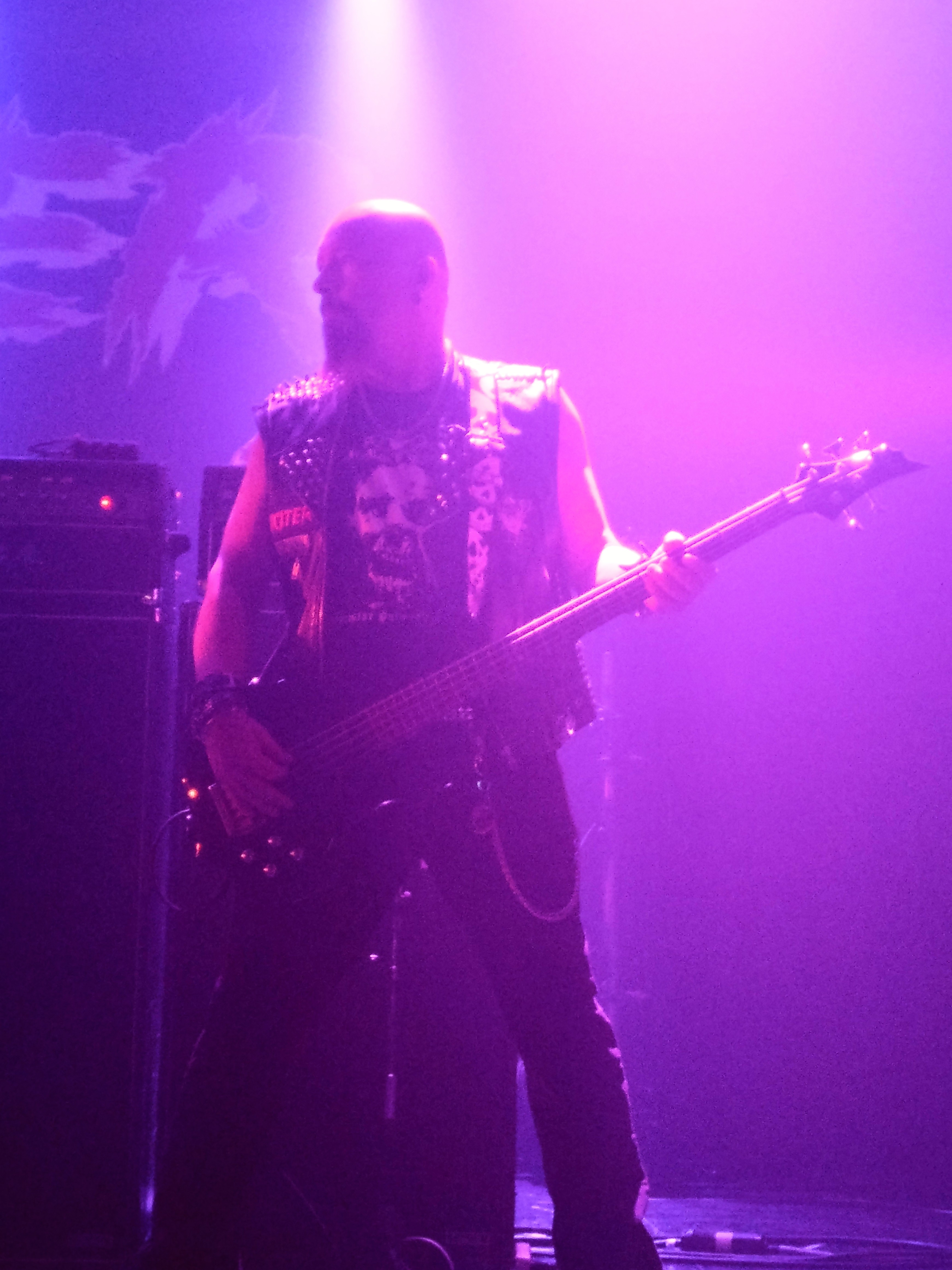
The reunited original line-up of Exciter: John Ricci, Dan Beehler and Allan James Johnson, April 2018 in Montreal, Canada
- Dan Beehler – vocals, drums (1978–1989, 1991–1993, 2014–2026)
- Allan James Johnson – bass, backing vocals (1978–1989, 2014–2026)
- Daniel Dekay – guitars (2018–2026)

=== Former ===
- John Ricci – guitars, vocals, bass (1978–1985, 1991–2018)
- Brian McPhee – guitars, vocals (1985–1989)
- Rob Malnati – vocals (1987–1989)
- David Ledden – bass (1991–1992)
- Jeff MacDonald – bass, backing vocals (1992–1993)
- Marc Charron – bass (1996–2002)
- Jacques Belanger – vocals (1996–2001, 2003–2006)
- Richard "Rik" Charron – drums (1996–2014)
- Robert William DeGroot – vocals (2001-2003)
- Paul Champagne – bass (2003-2004)
- Robert "Clammy" Cohen – bass (2004–2014)
- Kenny "Metal Mouth" Winter – vocals (2006–2014)

== Discography ==
=== Studio albums ===
- Heavy Metal Maniac (1983)
- Violence & Force (1984)
- Long Live the Loud (1985)
- Unveiling the Wicked (1986)
- Exciter / O.T.T. (1988)
- Kill After Kill (1992)
- The Dark Command (1997)
- Blood of Tyrants (2000)
- New Testament (2004)
- Thrash Speed Burn (2008)
- Death Machine (2010)

=== Live albums ===
- Better Live Than Dead (1993)

=== Compilation albums ===
- Capital Punishment (1991)

=== EPs ===
- Feel the Knife (1985)

=== Demo ===
- World War III (1982)
