= Funk on Ah Roll =

Single by James Brown

from the album I'm Back
- Released: 1998
- Genre: Funk, house, UK garage
- Label: Georgia-Lina; 825; Eagle; 073; Inferno; 13
- Songwriter(s): James Brown; Derrick Monk
- Producer(s): Derrick "New Funk" Monk

James Brown charting singles chronology
"Can't Get Any Harder" (1993)	"Funk on Ah Roll" (1998)	"Killing Is Out, School Is In" (2001)

Audio video
- "Funk on Ah Roll (S-Class Mix)" on YouTube

"Funk on Ah Roll" is a song written by James Brown and Derrick Monk and recorded by James Brown. It appears in three different versions on his 1998 album I'm Back, two of which are remixes. A number of additional remixes of the song, including a popular UK garage mix by Grant Nelson as Bump & Flex, were issued on 12" and CD in the United Kingdom in 1999, resulting in the song reaching No. 40 on the UK Singles Chart and No. 1 on the UK Dance Singles Chart. It did not chart in the United States.

The track reuses the guitar part and horn section of Brown's 1971 release "Hot Pants".

== Critical reception ==
Rolling Stone reviewed the song favorably, commenting that it "reclaim[s] Jimmy Nolen chicken scratch for the engine of life it is".
