= Tomi Rae Hynie =

American singer (born 1969)

- Born: May 21, 1969 (age 57); United States
- Occupation: Singer
- Years active: 1989–present
- Spouse: Javed Ahmed (m. 1997; ann. 2004)
- Partner: James Brown (1997–2006; his death)
- Children: 1

Tomi Rae Hynie (born May 21, 1969) is an American singer known for her relationship with James Brown and her legal battle for his estate. The couple married in 2001, but the legality of the marriage has been contested, with the Supreme Court of South Carolina finding it invalid.

== Singing career ==
Hynie worked as a sound-alike Janis Joplin impersonator in Las Vegas and as a backup singer in the James Brown Revue. She contributed vocals to James Brown's 2001 song "Killing Is Out, School Is In". She formed the all-female rock band, Hardly Dangerous, during the 1980s, and continues to perform with them. More recently, Hynie formed the rock and soul band, Godmother of Soul, which also features Quiet Riot bassist and founder, Kelly Garni; former drummer for The Cult, Lez Warner; and guitarist Raven Storm. In 2023 Tommie Rae joined the UK gospel blues band The Future Shape of Sound.

== Contested marriage to James Brown ==
The legality and status of Hynie's December 2001 marriage to James Brown was contested after his death in 2006.

According to Brown's longtime attorney, Albert "Buddy" Dallas, the marriage between Brown and Hynie was invalid because Hynie was married at that time to Javed Ahmed, an immigrant whom Hynie said married her for a green card. Hynie's marriage to Javed Ahmed was annulled in 2004, only after her marriage to Brown.

In an interview on CNN with Larry King, Hynie produced a 2001 marriage certificate as proof of her marriage to James Brown, but she did not provide King with court records pointing to an annulment of her marriage to him or to Ahmed. Hynie is also the mother of James Joseph Brown, Jr., born June 11, 2001.

=== Annulment of previous marriage to Javed Ahmed ===
According to Dallas, Brown was angry and hurt that Hynie concealed her prior marriage to Javed Ahmed from him. Brown moved to file for annulment of his marriage to Hynie, which occurred after he was charged with domestic violence against her.

In August 2003, Brown demonstrated his intention to annul his marriage to Hynie by taking out a full page notice in Variety Magazine that featured Hynie, James II and himself on vacation at Disney World to announce that he and Hynie were going their separate ways.

In addition to the public notice in Variety Magazine, Hynie was asked to leave an overseas tour after Brown found out about her other marriage. According to Hynie, she was returning to the United States at that time to sign papers proving that her previous marriage was indeed dissolved.

In 2004, the annulment of the marriage between Hynie and Javed Ahmed was granted by Family Court Judge F.P. "Charlie" Segars-Andrews in Charleston, South Carolina, dissolving the marriage on the basis that Hynie did not consummate the marriage with Ahmed and clearing the way for Brown and Hynie to remarry. Judge Segars-Andrews also mentioned in the ruling that Ahmed was already married to at least one other woman in Pakistan and that Ahmed had fraudulently married Hynie to obtain U.S. citizenship.

Albert "Buddy" Dallas, Brown's lawyer, also mentioned that, although Hynie's marriage to Javed Ahmed was annulled after she married James Brown, the Brown-Hynie marriage was still not valid under South Carolina law because Brown and Hynie did not remarry after the annulment.

Brown was to remarry Hynie once the annulment was granted, but he did not follow through on that action. According to Debra Opri, another of Brown's lawyers based in Los Angeles, Hynie knew that she was only Brown's companion, since Hynie signed a document in 2004 mentioning that she was not Brown's wife and that she would not refer to herself as his wife in the future.

On January 27, 2015, Judge Doyet Early III ruled that Tomi Rae Hynie Brown was officially the widow of James Brown and that she was now Brown's widow for purposes of determining the distribution of Brown's estate. The decision was based on the grounds that Hynie's previous marriage was invalid and that James Brown had abandoned his efforts to annul his own marriage to Hynie. On June 17, 2020, the South Carolina Supreme Court judge ruled that Hynie was not legally married to Brown due to her failure to annul her previous marriage. The court also officially ruled that she has no right to any part of his estate.

=== Paternity of James Brown II ===
In a separate CNN interview, Debra Opri, another Brown family attorney, revealed to Larry King that Brown wanted a DNA test performed after his death to confirm the paternity of James II — not for Brown's sake, but for the sake of the other family members. In April 2007, Hynie selected a guardian ad litem that she wants the court to appoint to represent James Brown II in the proceedings to establish paternity. According to Brown's attorney Buddy Dallas, Brown had a vasectomy in the 1980s while being sued for child support. In the 20+ years between the vasectomy and Brown's death, Hynie's child is the only child to claim Brown was his father. The estate asked Judge Rodney Peeples to establish a DNA protocol for identifying heirs, after seven years, Hynie's son had taken no DNA test under the protocol. In May 2014 a South Carolina judge agreed to the request of Hynie's attorney that any DNA test results for her son would be held "confidential."

By late 2000 Tomi Rae was pregnant with Brown's son, born in June 2001. Brown named the boy after himself – James Brown II – the only child he ever gave his own name to. "James thought his son might be president one day," recalls Tomi Rae. "When he named him he said, 'I gave him my name because I knew that having my name and being half white, he might actually have a shot in this world. He could become the president of the United States one day'. He said that this boy was going to do more than he ever did. I felt those shoes were too big to fill."

=== Brown estate claim ===
On the day after Brown's death, Hynie returned to Brown's home to find padlocks on the gates and security personnel guarding the property. According to Brown's attorneys, Brown's home was secured to protect the property in trust and prevent anyone from removing the property from the estate. On January 11, 2007, lawyers for the Brown estate read his will, and neither Hynie nor her son James II were named as beneficiaries of the estate.

Hynie contends that she was legally married to Brown at the time of his death and that she is entitled to half of Brown's estate because of marriage. On February 9, 2007, Hynie received permission from the court to access the Brown home to gather her belongings.

In July 2018, the Georgia Court of Appeals agreed with the local probate judge in Augusta that Hynie was the former wife and widow of James Brown, rejecting the arguments of Brown's children that she was not because of her prior marriage. It was later announced that the estate had reached a settlement with Hynie.

=== Burial of James Brown ===
More than ten weeks after the public and private memorial services for James Brown, Hynie and Brown's children agreed on a temporary burial site for James Brown. Brown was buried on March 10, 2007, in a crypt at a temporary site near the home of Deanna Brown Thomas, one of his daughters. The private ceremony for Brown's temporary burial was attended by Brown's children, Hynie and a host of other family and friends. According to Brown's family, Brown's body will remain buried at the temporary site while a public mausoleum is built for him and a decision has been made for his final resting place.
