= I'm Back (album) =

Studio album by James Brown
- Released: November 17, 1998
- Recorded: 1998
- Genre: Funk; soul; gospel
- Length: 60:10
- Label: Mercury
- Producer: James Brown

James Brown chronology
Universal James (1993)	I'm Back (1998)	The Merry Christmas Album (1999)

Professional ratings
Review scores
Source	Rating
AllMusic	2.5/5 stars
The Rolling Stone Album Guide	2/5 stars
Christgau's Consumer Guide	(2-star Honorable Mention)

I'm Back is the 57th studio album by American musician James Brown. The album was released on November 17, 1998, by Mercury Records.

== Critical reception ==
Rolling Stone's Robert Christgau complimented "James on the Loose", "Kare", and the three mixes of "Funk on Ah Roll", calling the album more memorable than many of his releases in the seventies. Jason Elias wrote for AllMusic that "I'm Back does have its share of duds, but it mostly shows Brown in command and still a viable presence".

== Track listing ==
No.	Title	Length
1.	"I Can't Stand It"	4:56
2.	"Funk on Ah Roll" (S-Class mix)	4:14
3.	"Kare"	4:02
4.	"What It Takes"	3:31
5.	"Papa's Got a Brand New Bag"	5:02
6.	"Break Away"	3:29
7.	"Funk on Ah Roll" (Original J.B. mix)	5:08
8.	"Lucky Old Sun"	5:50
9.	"I Don't Hear No Music"	7:25
10.	"Every Part of My Heart" (Instrumental)	4:51
11.	"Eden"	6:10
12.	"Peace in the World"	6:42
13.	"Funk on Ah Roll" (S-Class Club mix)	4:08
14.	"James on the Loose"	4:38
