= The Next Step (James Brown album) =

Studio album by James Brown
- Released: August 27, 2002
- Recorded: 2002
- Genre: Soul, funk
- Length: 54:20
- Label: Fome Records
- Producer: Derrick "New Funk" Monk

James Brown chronology
The Merry Christmas Album (1999)	The Next Step (2002)	The Federal Years 1956-1960 (2006)

Singles from The Next Step
- 1. "Killing Is Out, School Is In" Released: 2001

Professional ratings
Review scores
Source	Rating
The Rolling Stone Album Guide	2.5/5 stars

The Next Step is the 59th and final studio album by American musician James Brown. The album was released on August 27, 2002, by Fome Records.

"The following year he was the subject of a PBS American Masters documentary, James Brown: Soul Survivor. He continued performing well into the first decade of the 2000s, appearing at the second Bonnaroo festival in 2003, at the Edinburgh Live 8 concert in 2005, and setting out on his "Seven Decades Of Funk World Tour" in 2006."

Brown died of congestive heart failure due to complications from pneumonia on December 25, 2006, four years after The Next Step was released.

== Track listings ==
All tracks composed by James Brown and Derrick Monk; except where indicated

No.	Title	Writer(s)	Length
1.	"Automatic"		3:50
2.	"Send Her Back to Me"	James Brown, Bobby Byrd, Charles Bobbit, Derrick Monk	3:20
3.	"Motivation"		3:41
4.	"Sunshine"		4:03
5.	"Nothing But a Jam"		4:03
6.	"Baby You've Got What It Takes"	Clyde Otis, Murray Stein	4:03
7.	"It's Time"	James Brown, Tommy Rae	3:23
8.	"Why Did This Happen to Me"	James Brown, Bobby Byrd, Charles Bobbit, Derrick Monk	4:21
9.	"Good and Natural"		5:10
10.	"Killing Is Out, School Is In"	James Brown, Bobby Byrd, Charles Bobbit, Derrick Monk	2:46
