= (So Tired of Standing Still We Got to) Move On =

Single by James Brown

from the album Love Over-Due
- B-side: "You Are My Everything"
- Released: November 1991
- Genre: R&B, funk
- Length: 4:03, 6:32 (12" version)
- Label: Scotti Bros. 75286
- Songwriter: James Brown
- Producer: James Brown

James Brown charting singles chronology
"Gimme Your Love" (1989)	"(So Tired of Standing Still We Got to) Move On" (1991)	"Can't Get Any Harder" (1993)

Audio video
- "[So Tired Of Standing Still We Got] Move On" on YouTube

"(So Tired of Standing Still We Got to) Move On", titled simply "Move On" in some releases, is a song written and recorded by James Brown. It appeared as the lead track on his 1991 album Love Over-Due and was released as a single which charted #48 R&B. Rolling Stone praised the song for its "slapping guitar groove".
