= Gut Bucket (song) =

Song by James Brown

from the album James Brown's Funky Summer
- Released: August 2006
- Recorded: March 2005
- Studio: Ramada Inn, Augusta, GA
- Genre: Funk
- Length: 3:24
- Songwriters: Charles Bobbit; James Brown

"Gut Bucket" is a funk song performed by James Brown. It was recorded in 2005 with members of Brown's current touring band. Intended for a studio album that remains unreleased, it appeared instead on a CD compilation, James Brown's Funky Summer, included with the August 2006 issue of MOJO. It is the last original James Brown recording to be released to date.

== Personnel ==
- James Brown - lead vocals
- Keith Jenkins - guitar
- Damon Wood - guitar
- Fred Thomas - bass
- George "Spike" Nealy - shaker
- Robert "Mousey" Thompson or Erik Hargrove - drums
