= Can't Get Any Harder =

Single by James Brown

from the album Universal James
- Released: January 1993
- Recorded: 1992
- Genre: R&B; hip hop
- Label: Scotti Bros.
- Songwriters: Robert Clivillés; David Cole; Duran Ramos; Sheldon Scott; James Jackson; Trevor Smith; Bryan Higgins
- Producer: Clivillés and Cole

James Brown charting singles chronology
"(So Tired of Standing Still We Got to) Move On" (1991)	"Can't Get Any Harder" (1993)	"Funk on Ah Roll" (1998)

Audio video
- "Can't Get Any Harder" on YouTube

"Can't Get Any Harder" is a song by American singer James Brown from his fifty-sixth studio album, Universal James (1993). It was released in January 1993 via Scotti Brothers Records as the album's lead single. Written by C+C Music Factory members Robert Clivillés and David Cole, Trilogy's Duran Ramos, and Leaders of the New School, it was produced by Clivillés and Cole with co-production by Ricky Crespo, and features guest rap vocals from Trilogy and Leaders of the New School.

The single peaked at number 59 on the UK Singles Chart, as well as number 76 on the Hot R&B/Hip-Hop Songs and number 7 on the Dance Singles Sales, making it Brown's last charting single in the United States. It was also Brown's final music video to date, and featured a live dancer and college students.

== Critical reception ==
It was poorly received by critics; AllMusic described it as "strain[ing] for rap credibility", while Entertainment Weekly dismissed it as "junky".

== Track listing ==
No.	Title	Writer(s)	Producer(s)	Length
1.	"Can't Get Any Harder" (Radio Mix)	Robert Clivillés; David Cole; Duran Ramos; Sheldon Scott; James Jackson; Trevor Smith; Bryan Higgins	Clivillés and Cole; Ricky Crespo (co.)	3:53
2.	"Can't Get Any Harder" (Alternative Brown Radio Groove)	Clivillés; Cole; Ramos; Scott; Jackson; Smith; Higgins	Clivillés and Cole; Ricky Crespo (co.)	3:35
3.	"Can't Get Any Harder" (On The Edge Radio Mix)	Clivillés; Cole; Ramos; Scott; Jackson; Smith; Higgins	Clivillés and Cole; Ricky Crespo (co.)	5:21
4.	"Can't Get Any Harder" (C&C - Leaders Of The New School Mix)	Clivillés; Cole; Ramos; Scott; Jackson; Smith; Higgins	Clivillés and Cole; Ricky Crespo (co.); Leaders of the New School (co.)	4:53
5.	"Can't Get Any Harder" (Universal Hip Hop Mix)	Clivillés; Cole; Ramos; Scott; Jackson; Smith; Higgins	Clivillés and Cole; Ricky Crespo (co.)	9:59
6.	"Can't Get Any Harder" (Clivilles & Cole House Of Soul Mix)	Clivillés; Cole; Ramos; Scott; Jackson; Smith; Higgins	Clivillés and Cole; Ricky Crespo (co.)	13:07
Total length:				40:58

== Personnel ==
- James Brown – vocals
- Trilogy – rap vocals
- Bryan "Charlie Brown" Higgins – songwriter, rap vocals, additional producer (track 4)
- Sheldon "Cut Monitor Milo" Scott – songwriter, rap vocals, additional producer (track 4)
- Trevor "Busta Rhymes" Smith – songwriter, rap vocals, additional producer (track 4)
- James "Dinco D" Jackson – songwriter, rap vocals, additional producer (track 4)
- Robert Clivillés – songwriter, producer, arranger, editing, mixing, remixing
- David Cole – songwriter, producer, arranger, mixing, remixing
- Ricky Crespo – additional producer, programming, editing
- Alan Friedman – programming
- Acar Key – recording, mixing, engineering
- Katherine Miller – recording, engineering
- Richard Joseph – recording, engineering
- Herbert Powers Jr. – mastering

== Charts ==
Chart (1993)	Peak position
UK Singles (Official Charts)	59
UK Club Chart (Music Week)	6
US Hot R&B/Hip-Hop Songs (Billboard)	76
US Maxi-Singles Sales (Billboard)	14
