= The Merry Christmas Album =

Studio album by James Brown
- Released: November 16, 1999
- Recorded: 1999
- Genre: Funk, Christmas
- Length: 45:17
- Label: Waxworks Records
- Producer: Derrick Monk

James Brown chronology
I'm Back (1998)	The Merry Christmas Album (1999)	The Next Step (2002)

Professional ratings
Review scores
Source	Rating
AllMusic	1.5/5 stars

The Merry Christmas Album is the 58th studio album by American musician James Brown. The album was released on November 16, 1999, by Waxworks Records. It contains 11 Christmas related songs co-written with Derrick Monk, who also produced the album. Heather Phares, writing for AllMusic, felt the album was fun but not one of Brown's best. It is also Brown's fourth Christmas album in 31 years.

== Reception ==
In a review for AllMusic, Heather Phares felt the album followed the same pattern of his other Christmas albums with his usual funk music and social commentary lyrics; she concludes that the album is festive fun, but not up the standard of his best work.

== Track listing ==
No.	Title	Length
1.	"Sleigh Ride"	3:06
2.	"Clean for Christmas"	3:15
3.	"Spread Love"	4:14
4.	"Not Just Another Holiday"	3:27
5.	"Mom & Dad"	4:31
6.	"Christmas Is for Everyone"	3:47
7.	"God Gave Me This"	6:20
8.	"A Gift"	3:51
9.	"Reindeer on the Rooftop"	4:21
10.	"Funky Christmas Millennium"	4:04
11.	"Don't Forget the Poor at Christmas"	4:21
