= James Brown =

American musician (1933–2006)

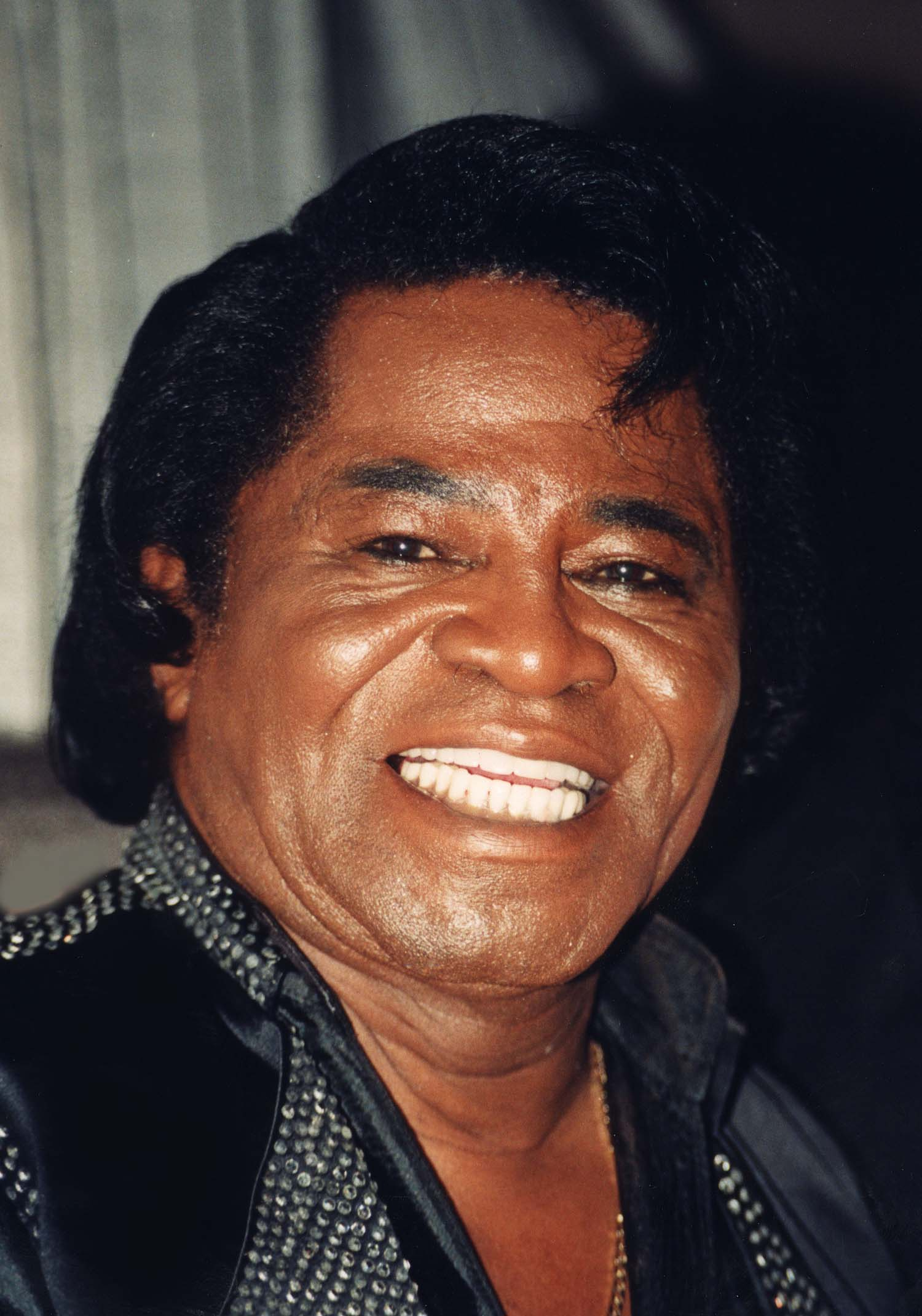
- Brown in 1996
- Born: James Joseph Brown; May 3, 1933; Barnwell, South Carolina, U.S.
- Died: December 25, 2006 (aged 73); Atlanta, Georgia, U.S.
- Occupations: Singer; songwriter; dancer; musician; record producer; bandleader
- Years active: 1953–2006
- Spouses: Velma Warren (m. 1953; div. 1969) Deidre Jenkins (m. 1970; div. 1981) Adrienne Rodriguez (m. 1984; died 1996)
- Partner: Tomi Rae Hynie (1997–2006)
- Children: 13
- Musical career
- Origin: Toccoa, Georgia, U.S.
- Genres: Soul; R&B; funk
- Instruments: Vocals; keyboards; drums; harmonica; guitar
- Works: Discography
- Labels: Federal; King; Smash; People; Polydor; TK; Scotti Bros.; Mercury; Republic; UM^{e}; A&M
- Formerly of: The Famous Flames; The J.B.'s; The Dapps
- Website: jamesbrown.com

James Joseph Brown (May 3, 1933 – December 25, 2006) was an American singer, songwriter, dancer, musician, and record producer. The central progenitor of funk music and a major figure of 20th-century music, he is referred to by various nicknames, among them "Mr. Dynamite", "the Hardest-Working Man in Show Business", "Minister of New Super Heavy Funk", "Godfather of Soul", "King of Soul", and "Soul Brother No. 1". In a career that lasted more than 50 years, he influenced the development of several music genres. Brown was one of the first ten inductees into the Rock and Roll Hall of Fame on January 23, 1986. His music has been heavily sampled by hip-hop musicians and other artists.

Brown began his career as a gospel singer in Toccoa, Georgia. He first rose to prominence in the mid-1950s as the lead singer of the Famous Flames, a rhythm and blues vocal group founded by Bobby Byrd. With the hit ballads "Please, Please, Please" and "Try Me", Brown built a reputation as a dynamic live performer with the Famous Flames and his backing band, sometimes known as the James Brown Band or the James Brown Orchestra. His success peaked in the 1960s with the live album Live at the Apollo and hit singles such as "Papa's Got a Brand New Bag", "I Got You (I Feel Good)" and "It's a Man's Man's Man's World".

During the late 1960s, Brown moved from a continuum of blues and gospel-based forms and styles to a new approach to music-making, emphasizing stripped-down interlocking rhythms that influenced the development of funk music. By the early 1970s, Brown had fully established the funk sound after the formation of the J.B.s with records such as "Get Up (I Feel Like Being a) Sex Machine" and "The Payback". He also became noted for songs of social commentary, including the 1968 hit "Say It Loud – I'm Black and I'm Proud". Brown continued to perform and record until his death from pneumonia in 2006.

Brown recorded and released 17 singles that reached No. 1 on the Billboard R&B charts. He also holds the record for the most singles listed on the Billboard Hot 100 chart that did not reach No. 1. Brown was posthumously inducted into the first class of the Rhythm & Blues Music Hall of Fame in 2013 as an artist and then in 2017 as a songwriter. He received honors from several other institutions, including inductions into the Black Music & Entertainment Walk of Fame and the Songwriters Hall of Fame. In Joel Whitburn's analysis of the Billboard R&B charts from 1942 to 2010, Brown is ranked No. 1 in the Top 500 Artists. He is ranked seventh on Rolling Stone's list of the 100 Greatest Artists of All Time, and at No. 44 on their list of the 200 Greatest Singers of All Time.

== Early life ==
James Joseph Brown was born on May 3, 1933, in a small wooden shack located in Barnwell, South Carolina, to a 16-year-old young American Black woman named Susie (née Behling; 1916–2004), and 21-year-old American Black and Native-American Joseph Gardner Brown (1912–1993). Brown's name was supposed to have been Joseph James Brown, but his first and middle names were mistakenly reversed on his birth certificate. The Brown family lived in poverty in Elko, South Carolina, which was an impoverished town in 1933. They moved to Augusta, Georgia when James was four or five. His family first settled at one of his aunts' brothels and later moved into a house shared with another aunt. Brown's mother eventually left the family after a contentious and abusive marriage and moved to New York.

Brown began singing in talent shows as a young child, first appearing at Augusta's Lenox Theater in 1944, winning the show after singing the ballad "So Long". While in Augusta, Brown performed buck dances for change to entertain troops from Camp Gordon at the start of World War II as their convoys traveled over a canal bridge near his aunt's home, where he first heard the legendary blues musician Howlin' Wolf play guitar. He learned to play the piano, guitar, and harmonica during this period, and became inspired to become an entertainer after hearing "Caldonia" by Louis Jordan and his Tympany Five. In his teen years, Brown briefly had a career as a boxer.

At the age of 16, Brown was convicted of robbery and sent to a juvenile detention center in Toccoa. There, he formed a gospel quartet with four cellmates, including Johnny Terry. Brown met singer Bobby Byrd when the two played against each other in a baseball game outside the detention center. Byrd discovered that Brown could sing after hearing of "a guy called Music Box", which was Brown's nickname at the prison. Byrd has since said he and his family helped to secure an early release, which led to Brown promising the court he would "sing for the Lord".

Brown was released on a work sponsorship with Toccoa business owner S. C. Lawson, who was impressed with Brown's work ethic and secured his release with a promise to keep him employed for two years. Brown was paroled on June 14, 1952. Brown went on to work with both of Lawson's sons, and came back to visit the family from time to time throughout his career. Shortly after being paroled, he joined the gospel group the Ever-Ready Gospel Singers, featuring Byrd's sister Sarah.

== Music career ==
=== 1954–1961: The Famous Flames ===
Brown joined Bobby Byrd's group in 1954, having evolved from the Gospel Starlighters, an a cappella gospel group, to the Avons, an R&B group. He reputedly joined the band after one of its members, Troy Collins, died in a car crash. Along with Brown and Byrd, the group consisted of Sylvester Keels, Doyle Oglesby, Fred Pulliam, Nash Knox and Nafloyd Scott. Influenced by R&B groups such as Hank Ballard and the Midnighters, the Orioles, and Billy Ward and his Dominoes, the group changed its name, first to the Toccoa Band and then to the Flames. Nafloyd's brother Baroy later joined the group on bass guitar. Brown, Byrd and Keels switched lead positions and instruments, often playing drums and piano. Johnny Terry later joined, by which time Pulliam and Oglesby had long left.

Berry Trimier became the group's first manager, booking them at parties near college campuses in Georgia and South Carolina. The group had already gained a reputation as a good live act when they renamed themselves the Famous Flames. In 1955, the group contacted Little Richard while performing in Macon. Richard convinced the group to get in contact with his manager at the time, Clint Brantley, at his nightclub. Brantley agreed to manage them after seeing the group audition. He then sent them to a local radio station to record a demo session, where they performed their own composition "Please, Please, Please", which was inspired when Little Richard wrote the words of the title on a napkin and Brown was determined to make a song out of it.

The Famous Flames eventually signed with King Records' Federal subsidiary in Cincinnati, Ohio, and issued a re-recorded version of "Please, Please, Please" in March 1956. The song became the group's first R&B hit, selling more than a million copies. None of their follow-ups gained similar success. In 1957, Brown replaced Clint Brantley as manager and hired Ben Bart, chief of Universal Attractions Agency. In 1957 the original Flames broke up, after Bart changed the name of the group to "James Brown and The Famous Flames".

In October 1958, Brown released the ballad "Try Me", which hit number one on the R&B chart in the beginning of 1959, becoming the first of seventeen chart-topping R&B hits. Shortly afterwards, he recruited his first band, led by J. C. Davis, and reunited with Bobby Byrd who joined a revived Famous Flames lineup that included Eugene "Baby" Lloyd Stallworth and Bobby Bennett, with Johnny Terry sometimes coming in as the "fifth Flame". Brown, the Flames, and his entire band debuted at the Apollo Theater on April 24, 1959, opening for Brown's idol, Little Willie John.

Federal Records issued two albums credited to Brown and the Famous Flames. Both contained previously released singles. In 1960, Brown began multi-tasking in the recording studio involving himself, his singing group, the Famous Flames, and his band, a separate entity from the Flames, sometimes named the James Brown Orchestra or the James Brown Band. In 1960, the band released the top ten R&B hit "(Do the) Mashed Potatoes" on Dade Records, owned by Henry Stone, billed under the pseudonym "Nat Kendrick & the Swans" due to label issues. As a result of its success, King president Syd Nathan shifted Brown's contract from Federal to the parent label, King, which according to Brown in his autobiography meant "you got more support from the company". While with King, Brown, under the Famous Flames lineup, released the hit-filled album Think! and in 1961 released two albums with the James Brown Band earning second billing. With the Famous Flames, Brown sang lead on several more hits, including "Bewildered", "I'll Go Crazy" and "Think", songs that hinted at his emerging style.

=== 1962–1966: Mr. Dynamite ===
In 1962, Brown and his band scored a hit with their cover of the instrumental "Night Train", becoming a top five R&B single. That same year, the ballads "Lost Someone" and "Baby You're Right", the latter a Joe Tex composition, added to his repertoire and increased his reputation with R&B audiences. On October 24, 1962, Brown financed a live recording of a performance at the Apollo and convinced Syd Nathan to release the album, despite Nathan's belief that no one would buy a live album due to the fact that Brown's singles had already been bought and that live albums were usually bad sellers.

Live at the Apollo was released in June 1963 and became an immediate hit, eventually reaching number two on the Top LPs chart and selling more than a million copies, staying on the charts for 14 months. In 1963, Brown scored his first top 20 pop hit with his rendition of the standard "Prisoner of Love". He launched his first label, Try Me Records, which included recordings by Tammy Montgomery, later to be famous as Tammi Terrell, Johnny & Bill (Famous Flames associates Johnny Terry and Bill Hollings) and the Poets, which was another name used for Brown's backing band. During this time, Brown began an ill-fated two-year relationship with 17-year-old Tammi Terrell when she sang in his revue. Terrell ended their personal and professional relationship because of Brown's abusive behavior.

In 1964, seeking bigger commercial success, Brown and Bobby Byrd formed the production company, Fair Deal, linking the operation to the Mercury imprint, Smash Records. King Records fought against this and was granted an injunction preventing Brown from releasing any recordings for the label. Prior to the injunction, Brown had released three vocal singles, including the blues-oriented hit "Out of Sight", which further indicated the direction his music was going to take. Touring throughout the year, Brown and the Famous Flames grabbed more national attention after delivering an explosive show-stopping performance on the live concert film The T.A.M.I. Show. The Flames' dynamic gospel-tinged vocals, polished choreography and timing as well as Brown's energetic dance moves and high-octane singing upstaged the proposed closing act, the Rolling Stones.

Having signed a new deal with King, in 1965 Brown released his song "Papa's Got a Brand New Bag", which became his first top-ten pop hit and won him his first Grammy Award. Brown signed a production deal with Loma Records. Later in 1965, he issued "I Got You", which became his second single in a row to reach number one on the R&B chart and top ten on the pop chart. Brown followed that up with the ballad "It's a Man's Man's Man's World", a third Top-10 Pop hit (No. 1 R&B), which confirmed his stance as a top-ranking performer, especially with R&B audiences, from that point on.

=== 1967–1970: Soul Brother No. 1 ===
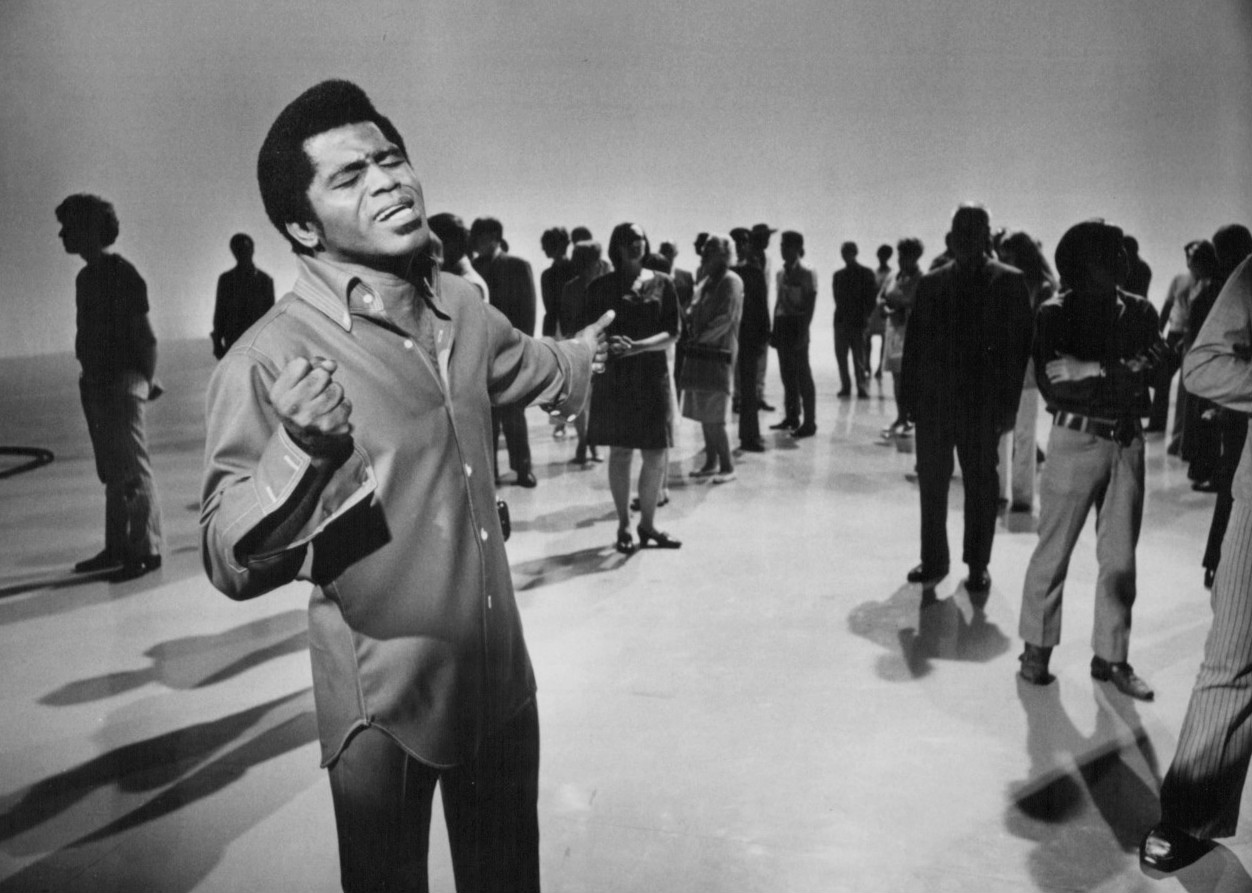
Brown performing in 1969

By 1967, Brown's emerging sound began to be defined as funk music. That year, he released what some critics cited as the first true funk song, "Cold Sweat", which hit number-one on the R&B chart (Top 10 Pop) and became one of his first recordings to contain a drum break and the first that featured a harmony that was reduced to a single chord. The instrumental arrangements on tracks such as "Give It Up or Turnit a Loose" and "Licking Stick – Licking Stick", both recorded in 1968, and "Funky Drummer", recorded in 1969, featured a more developed version of Brown's mid-1960s style, with the horn section, guitars, bass and drums meshed together in intricate rhythmic patterns based on multiple interlocking riffs.

Changes in Brown's style that started with "Cold Sweat" established the musical foundation for Brown's later hits, such as "I Got the Feelin'" (1968) and "Mother Popcorn" (1969). By this time Brown's vocals frequently took the form of a kind of rhythmic declamation, not quite sung but not quite spoken, that only intermittently featured traces of pitch or melody. This became a major influence on the techniques of rapping, which would come to maturity along with hip-hop in the coming decades. Brown's style of funk in the late 1960s was based on interlocking syncopated parts: strutting bass lines, syncopated drum patterns, and iconic percussive guitar riffs.

The main guitar ostinatos for 1969's "Ain't It Funky" and "Give It Up or Turnit a Loose", are examples of Brown's refinement of New Orleans funk; irresistibly danceable riffs, stripped down to their rhythmic essence. On both recordings, the tonal structure is bare bones. The pattern of attack points is the emphasis, not the pattern of pitches as if the guitar were an African drum or idiophone. Alexander Stewart states that this popular feel was passed along from "New Orleans—through James Brown's music, to the popular music of the 1970s". Those same tracks were later resurrected by countless hip-hop musicians from the 1970s onward. As a result, James Brown remains to this day the world's most sampled recording artist. Two tracks that he wrote, are synonymous with modern dance, especially with house music, jungle music, and drum and bass music, which were sped up exponentially, in the latter two genres.

"Bring it Up" has an Afro-Cuban guajeo-like structure. All three of these guitar riffs are based on an onbeat/offbeat structure. Stewart says that it "is different from a time line (such as clave and tresillo) in that it is not an exact pattern, but more of a loose organizing principle."

It was around this time as the musician's popularity increased that he acquired the nickname "Soul Brother No. 1", after failing to win the title "King of Soul" from Solomon Burke during a Chicago gig two years prior. Brown's recordings during this period influenced musicians across the industry, most notably groups such as Sly and the Family Stone, Funkadelic, Charles Wright & the Watts 103rd Street Rhythm Band, Booker T. & the M.G.s as well as vocalists such as Edwin Starr, David Ruffin and Dennis Edwards from the Temptations, and Michael Jackson, who, throughout his career, cited Brown as his ultimate idol.

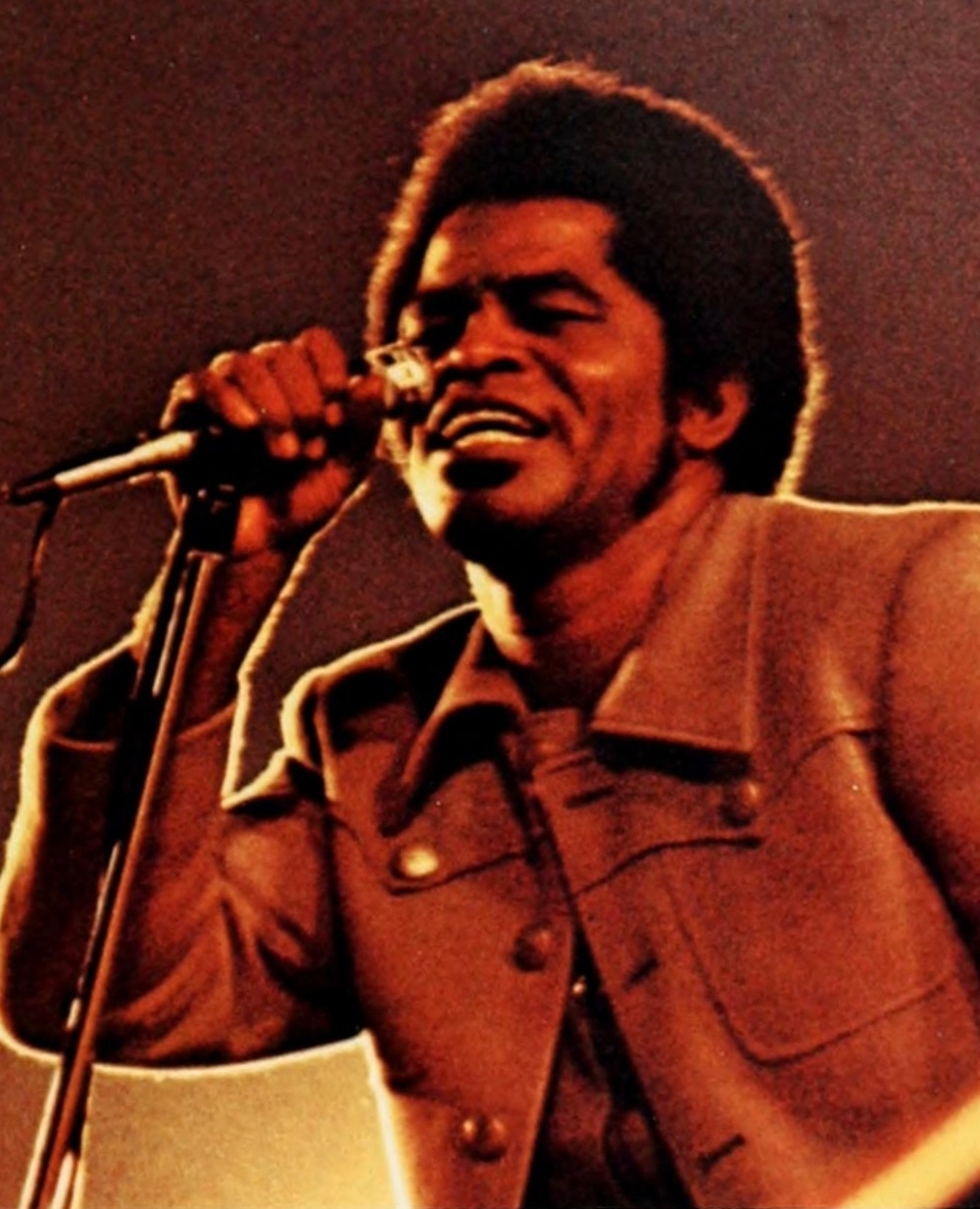
Brown performing in 1970

Brown's band during this period employed musicians and arrangers who had come up through the jazz tradition. He was noted for his ability as a bandleader and songwriter to blend the simplicity and drive of R&B with the rhythmic complexity and precision of jazz. Trumpeter Lewis Hamlin and saxophonist/keyboardist Alfred "Pee Wee" Ellis, the successor to previous bandleader Nat Jones, led the band. Guitarist Jimmy Nolen provided percussive, deceptively simple riffs for each song, and Maceo Parker's prominent saxophone solos provided a focal point for many performances. Other members of Brown's band included stalwart Famous Flames singer and sideman Bobby Byrd, trombonist Fred Wesley, drummers John "Jabo" Starks, Clyde Stubblefield and Melvin Parker, saxophonist St. Clair Pinckney, guitarist Alphonso "Country" Kellum and bassist Bernard Odum.

In addition to a torrent of singles and studio albums, Brown's output during this period included two more successful live albums, Live at the Garden (1967) and Live at the Apollo, Volume II (1968), and a 1968 television special, James Brown: Man to Man. His music empire expanded along with his influence on the music scene. As Brown's music empire grew, his desire for financial and artistic independence grew as well. Brown bought radio stations during the late 1960s, including WRDW in his native Augusta, where he shined shoes as a boy. In November 1967, James Brown purchased radio station WGYW in Knoxville, Tennessee, for a reported $75,000, according to the January 20, 1968 Record World magazine. The call letters were changed to WJBE reflecting his initials. WJBE began on January 15, 1968, and broadcast a Rhythm & Blues format. The station slogan was "WJBE 1430 Raw Soul". Brown bought WEBB in Baltimore in 1970.

Brown branched out to make several recordings with musicians outside his own band. In an attempt to appeal to the older, more affluent, and predominantly white adult contemporary audience, Brown recorded Gettin' Down to It (1969) and Soul on Top (1970)—two albums consisting mostly of romantic ballads, jazz standards, and homologous reinterpretations of his earlier hits—with the Dee Felice Trio and the Louie Bellson Orchestra. In 1968, he recorded a number of funk-oriented tracks with the Dapps, a white Cincinnati band, including the hit "I Can't Stand Myself". He also released three albums of Christmas music with his own band.

=== 1970–1974: Godfather of Soul ===
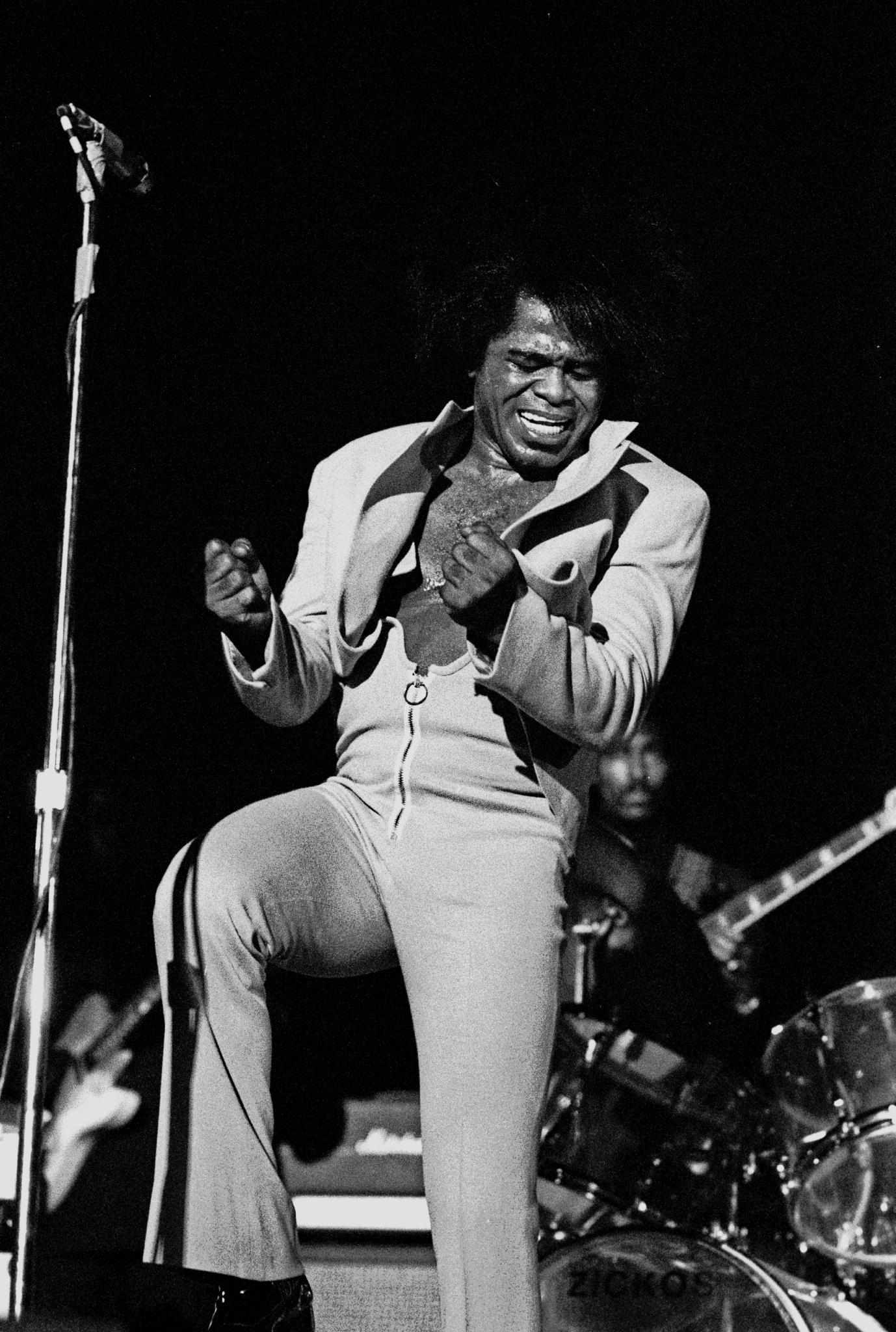
Brown performing in Hamburg, West Germany in 1973

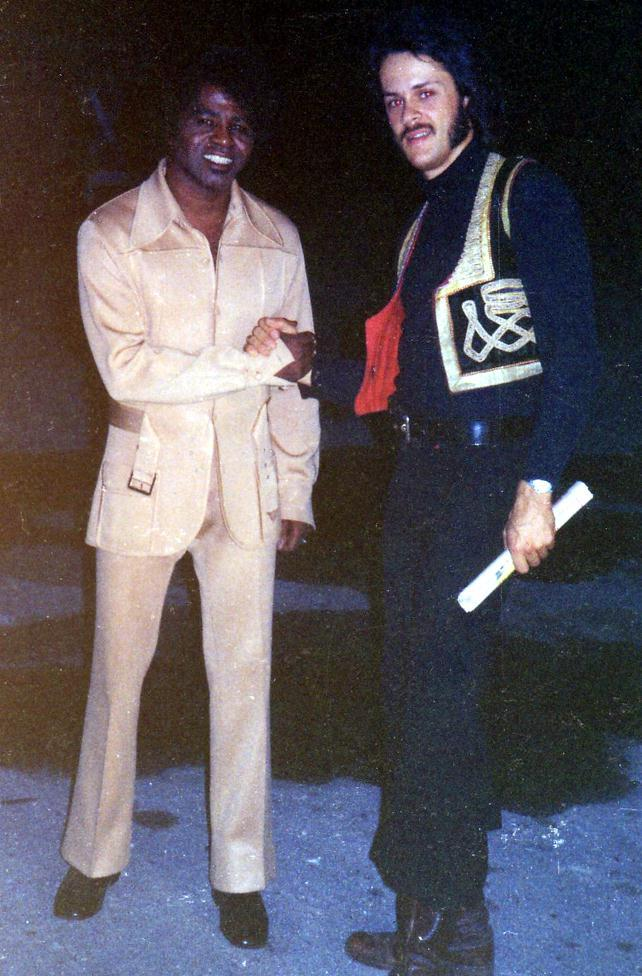
Brown with a disc-jockey after a concert in Tampa, 1972

In March 1970, most of Brown's mid-to-late 1960s road band walked out on him due to financial disputes, a development augured by the prior disbandment of the Famous Flames singing group for the same reason in 1968. Brown and erstwhile Famous Flames singer Bobby Byrd, who chose to remain in the band during this tumultuous period as co-frontman, effectively serving as a proto-hype man in live performances, recruited several members of the Pacemakers, a Cincinnati-based ensemble that included bassist Bootsy Collins and his brother, guitarist Phelps "Catfish" Collins; augmented by the remaining members of the 1960s road band, including Fred Wesley, who rejoined Brown's outfit in December 1970, and other newer musicians, they formed the nucleus of the J.B.'s, Brown's new backing ensemble.

Shortly following their first performance together, the band entered the studio to record the Brown-Byrd composition, "Get Up (I Feel Like Being a) Sex Machine". The song—‌with its off the beat play Brown called "The One"—‌and other contemporaneous singles further cemented Brown's influence in the nascent genre of funk music. This iteration of the J.B.'s dissolved after a March 1971 European tour (documented on the 1991 archival release Love Power Peace) due to additional money disputes and Bootsy Collins's use of LSD; a new lineup of the J.B.'s coalesced around Wesley, St. Clair Pinckney and drummer John Starks.

In 1971, Brown began recording for Polydor Records in a deal with Starday-King Records which included music publishing and Brown's back catalog. Many of his sidemen and supporting players, including Fred Wesley & the J.B.'s, Bobby Byrd, Lyn Collins, Vicki Anderson and former rival Hank Ballard, released records on the People label.

During the 1972 presidential election, James Brown openly proclaimed his support of Richard Nixon for reelection to the presidency over Democratic candidate George McGovern. The decision led to a boycott of his performances and, according to Brown, cost him a big portion of his black audience. As a result, Brown's record sales and concerts in the United States were in a lull in 1973, as he failed to land a number-one R&B single that year. In 1973 he also faced problems with the IRS for failure to pay back taxes, charging he hadn't paid upwards of $4.5 million; five years earlier, the IRS had claimed he owed nearly $2 million.

In 1973, Brown provided the score for the blaxploitation film Black Caesar. In 1974 he returned to the No. 1 spot on the R&B charts with "The Payback", with the parent album reaching the same spot on the album charts. He reached No. 1 two more times in 1974, with "My Thang" and "Papa Don't Take No Mess".

"Papa Don't Take No Mess" was his final single to reach the No. 1 spot on the R&B charts. His other Top Ten R&B hits during this latter period included "Funky President" (R&B No. 4) and "Get Up Offa That Thing" (R&B No. 4).

=== 1975–2006: Later career ===
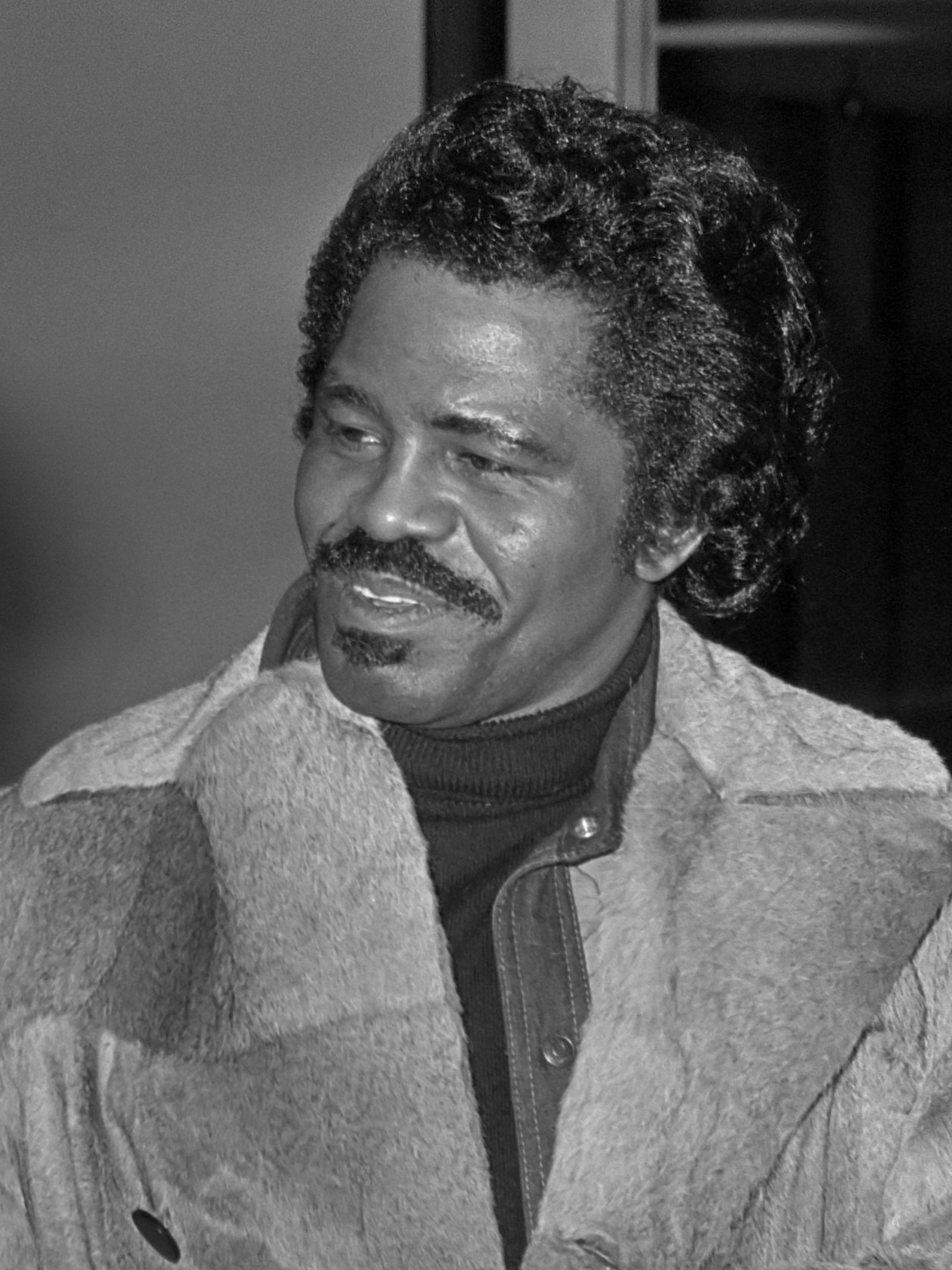
James Brown, 1977

Although his records were mainstays of the vanguard New York underground disco scene, exemplified by DJs such as David Mancuso and Francis Grasso, from 1969 onwards, Brown did not consciously yield to the trend until 1975's Sex Machine Today. By 1977, he was no longer a dominant force in R&B. After "Get Up Offa That Thing", thirteen of Brown's late 1970s recordings for Polydor failed to reach the Top 10 of the R&B chart, with only "Bodyheat" in 1976 and the disco-oriented "It's Too Funky in Here" in 1979 reaching the R&B Top 15 and the ballad "Kiss in 77" reaching the Top 40.

After 1976's "Bodyheat", he failed to appear on the Billboard Hot 100. As a result, Brown's concert attendance began dropping and his reported disputes with the IRS caused his business empire to collapse. In addition, several longtime bandmates, including Wesley and Maceo Parker, had gradually pivoted to Parliament-Funkadelic, which reached its critical and commercial apogee in the mid-to-late 1970s. The emergence of disco forestalled Brown's success on the R&B charts, because its slicker, more commercial style had superseded his rawer, one-chord funk productions.

By the release of 1979's The Original Disco Man, Brown seldom contributed to the songwriting and production processes, leaving most of it to producer Brad Shapiro. This resulted in the song "It's Too Funky in Here" becoming Brown's most successful single in this period. After two more albums failed to chart, Brown left Polydor in 1981. It was around this time that Brown changed the name of his band from the J.B.'s to the Soul Generals, or Soul G's. The band retained that name until his death.

Despite Brown's declining record sales, promoters Gary LoConti and Jim Rissmiller helped Brown sell out a string of residency shows at the Reseda Country Club in Los Angeles in early 1982. Brown's compromised commercial standing prevented him from charging a large fee. However, the great success of these shows marked a turning point for Brown's career, and soon he was back on top in Hollywood. Movies followed, including appearances in Doctor Detroit (1983) and Rocky IV (1985). He guest-starred in the Miami Vice episode "Missing Hours" (1987). Previously, Brown appeared alongside a litany of other Black musical luminaries in The Blues Brothers (1980).

In 1984, he teamed with rap musician Afrika Bambaataa on the song "Unity". A year later he signed with Scotti Brothers Records and issued the moderately successful album Gravity in 1986 with a popular song "How Do You Stop". It included Brown's final Top Ten pop hit, "Living in America", marking his first Top 40 entry since 1974 and his first Top Ten pop entry since 1968. Produced and written by Dan Hartman, it featured prominently on the Rocky IV film and soundtrack. Brown performed the song in the film at Apollo Creed's final fight, shot in the Ziegfeld Room at the MGM Grand in Las Vegas, and was credited in the film as the Godfather of Soul. 1986 also saw the publication of his autobiography, James Brown: The Godfather of Soul, co-written with Bruce Tucker. In 1987, Brown won the Grammy for Best Male R&B Vocal Performance for "Living in America".

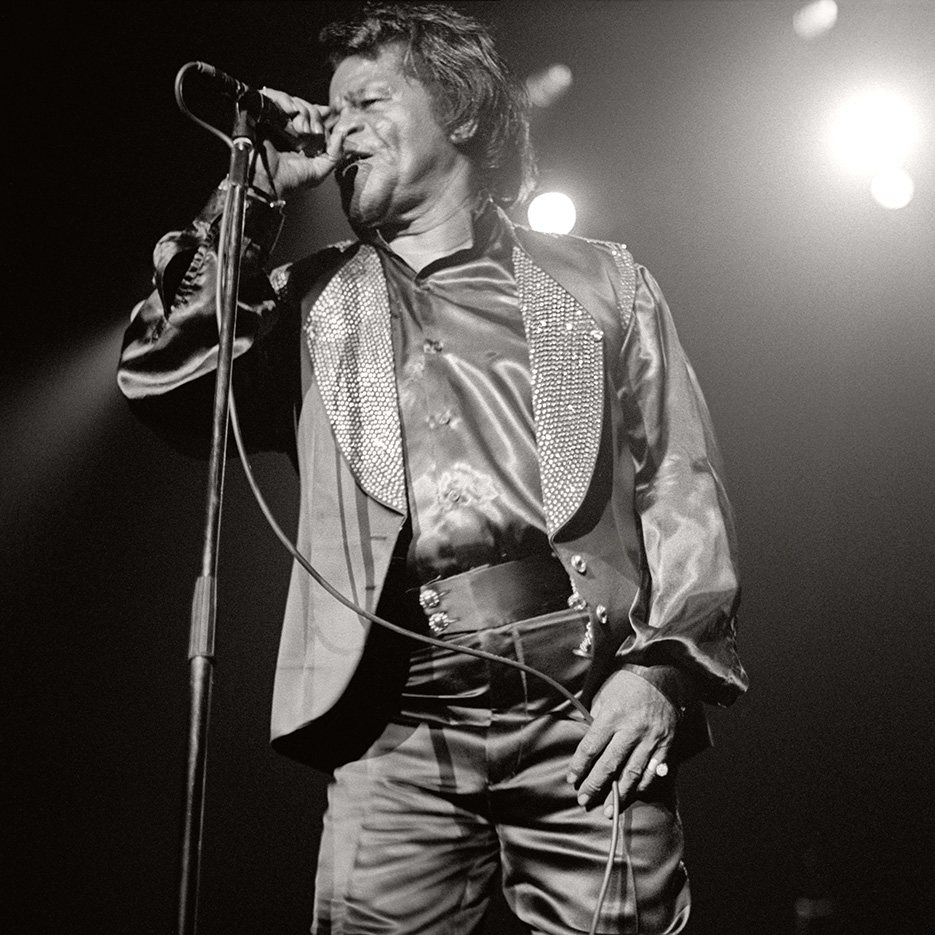
Brown performing in 1998

In 1988, Brown worked with the production team Full Force on the new jack swing-influenced I'm Real. It spawned his final two Top 10 R&B hits, "I'm Real" and "Static", which peaked at No. 2 and No. 5, respectively. Meanwhile, the drum break from the second version of the original 1969 hit "Give It Up Or Turnit A Loose", the recording included on the compilation album In the Jungle Groove, became so popular at hip-hop dance parties, especially for breakdance, during the early 1980s that hip-hop pioneer Kurtis Blow called the song "the national anthem of hip-hop".

After his stint in prison during the late 1980s, Brown met Larry Fridie and Thomas Hart who produced the first James Brown biopic, entitled James Brown: The Man, the Message, the Music, released in 1992. He returned to music with the album Love Over-Due in 1991. It included the single "(So Tired of Standing Still We Got to) Move On", which peaked at No. 48 on the R&B chart. His former record label Polydor released the four-CD box set Star Time, spanning Brown's career to date. Brown's release from prison prompted his former record labels to reissue his albums on CD, featuring additional tracks and commentary by music critics and historians.

In 1991, Brown appeared on rapper MC Hammer's video for "Too Legit to Quit". Hammer had been noted, alongside Big Daddy Kane, for bringing Brown's unique stage shows and their own energetic dance moves to the hip-hop generation. Both listed Brown as their idol. Both musicians sampled his work, with Hammer having sampled the rhythms from "Super Bad" for his song "Here Comes the Hammer", from his best-selling album Please Hammer, Don't Hurt 'Em. Big Daddy Kane sampled many times.

On June 10, 1991, James Brown and a star-filled line up performed before a crowd at the Wiltern Theatre in Los Angeles for a live pay-per-view at-home audience. James Brown: Living in America – Live! was the brainchild of Indiana producer Danny Hubbard. It featured M.C. Hammer as well as Bell Biv Devoe, Heavy D & the Boys, En Vogue, C+C Music Factory, Quincy Jones, Sherman Hemsley and Keenen Ivory Wayans. Ice-T, Tone Loc and Kool Moe Dee performed paying homage to Brown. This was Brown's first public performance since his parole from the South Carolina prison system in February. He had served two-and-a-half years of two concurrent six-year sentences for aggravated assault and other felonies.

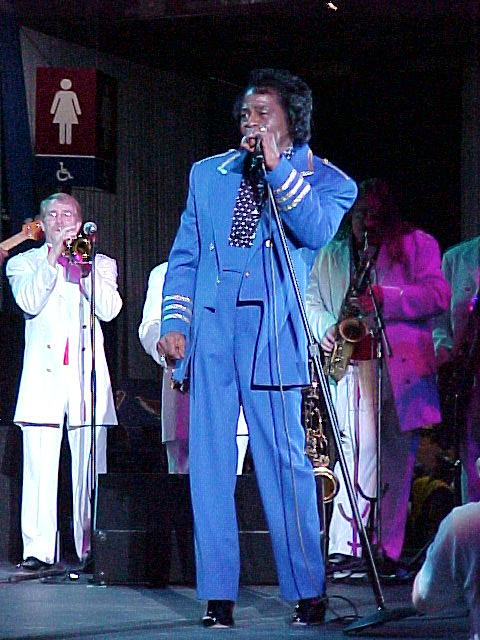
Brown during the NBA All-Star Game jam session, 2001

Brown continued making recordings. In 1993, his album Universal James was released. It included his final Billboard charting single, "Can't Get Any Harder", which peaked at No. 76 on the US R&B chart and reached No. 59 on the UK chart. Its brief charting in the UK was probably due to the success of a remixed version of "I Feel Good" featuring Dakeyne. Brown released the singles "How Long" and "Georgia-Lina", which failed to chart. In 1995, Brown returned to the Apollo and recorded Live at the Apollo 1995. It included a studio track titled "Respect Me", which was released as a single. Again, it failed to chart.

Brown's final studio albums, I'm Back and The Next Step, were released in 1998 and 2002 respectively. I'm Back featured the song "Funk on Ah Roll", which peaked at No. 40 in the UK but did not chart in his native US. The Next Step included Brown's final single, "Killing Is Out, School Is In". Both albums were produced by Derrick Monk. Brown's concert success remained unabated and he kept up with a grueling schedule throughout the remainder of his life, living up to his previous nickname, "The Hardest Working Man in Show Business", in spite of his advanced age. In 2003, Brown participated in the PBS American Masters television documentary James Brown: Soul Survivor, which was directed by Jeremy Marre.

Brown performed in the Super Bowl XXXI halftime show in 1997.

Brown celebrated his status as an icon by appearing in a variety of entertainment and sports events, including an appearance on the WCW pay-per-view event, SuperBrawl X, where he danced alongside wrestler Ernest "the Cat" Miller, who based his character on Brown, during his in-ring skit with the Maestro. Brown appeared in Tony Scott's short film Beat the Devil in 2001. He was featured alongside Clive Owen, Gary Oldman, Danny Trejo and Marilyn Manson. Brown made a cameo appearance in the 2002 Jackie Chan film The Tuxedo, in which Chan was required to finish Brown's act after having accidentally knocked out the singer. In 2002, Brown appeared in Undercover Brother, playing himself.

In 2004, Brown opened for the Red Hot Chili Peppers at several Hyde Park concerts in London. The beginning of 2005 saw the publication of his second book, I Feel Good: A Memoir of a Life of Soul, written with Marc Eliot. In February and March 2005, he participated in recording sessions for an intended studio album with Fred Wesley, Pee Wee Ellis, and other longtime collaborators. Though he lost interest in the album, which remains unreleased, a track from the sessions, "Gut Bucket", appeared on a compilation CD included with the August 2006 issue of MOJO.

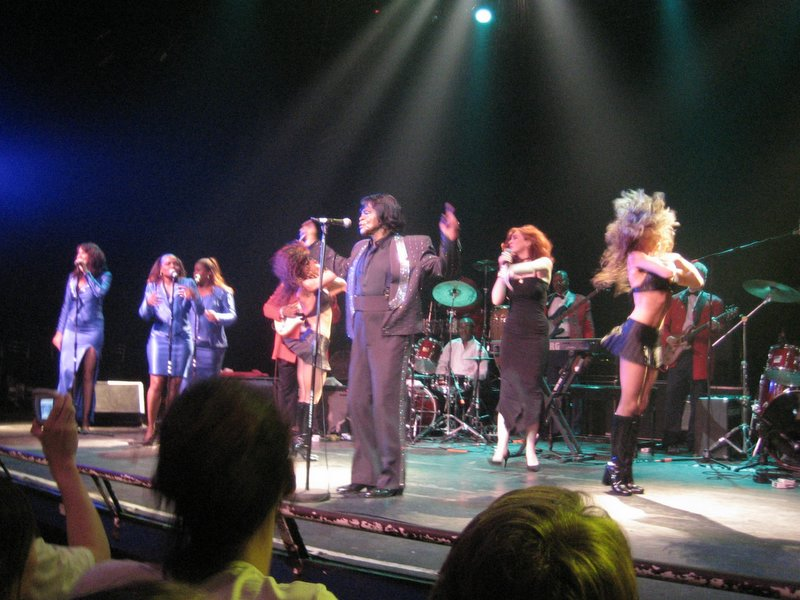
Brown performing, June 2005

Brown appeared at Edinburgh 50,000 – The Final Push, the final Live 8 concert on July 6, 2005, where he performed a duet with British pop star Will Young on "Papa's Got A Brand New Bag". In the Black Eyed Peas album "Monkey Business", Brown was featured on a track called "They Don't Want Music". The previous week he had performed a duet with another British pop star, Joss Stone, on the United Kingdom chat show Friday Night with Jonathan Ross. In 2006, Brown continued his Seven Decades of Funk World Tour.

Brown's final major U.S. performance was in San Francisco on August 20, 2006, as headliner at the Festival of the Golden Gate (Foggfest) on the Great Meadow at Fort Mason. The next day, he performed at an 800-seat campus theatre at Humboldt State University in Arcata, California. His last shows were greeted with positive reviews, and one of his final concert appearances at the Irish Oxegen festival in Punchestown in 2006 included a record crowd of 80,000 people. He played a full concert as part of the BBC's Electric Proms on October 27, 2006, at The Roundhouse, supported by The Zutons, with special appearances from Max Beesley and Sugababes.

Brown's last televised appearance was at his induction into the UK Music Hall of Fame in November 2006, before his death in December. He had been scheduled to perform a duet with singer Annie Lennox on the song "Vengeance" for her new album Venus, which was released in 2007.

== Artistry ==
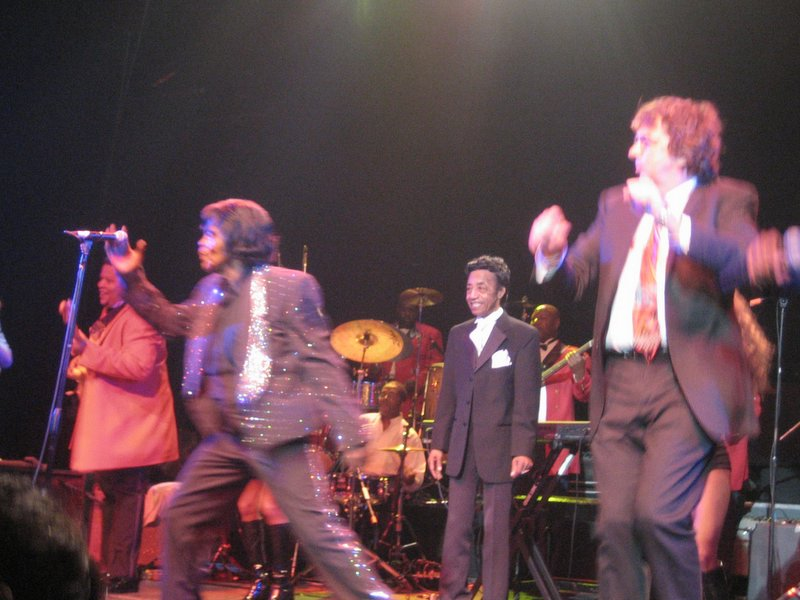
Brown's most famous MC was Danny Ray (center), who was with him for over 30 years.

As a vocalist, Brown performed in a forceful shout style derived from gospel music. Meanwhile, "his rhythmic grunts and expressive shrieks harked back farther still to ring shouts, work songs, and field cries", according to the Encyclopedia of African-American Culture and History (1996): "He reimported the rhythmic complexity from which rhythm and blues, under the dual pressure of rock 'n' roll and pop, had progressively fallen away since its birth from jazz and blues."

For many years, Brown's touring show was one of the most extravagant productions in American popular music. At the time of Brown's death, his band included three guitarists, two bass guitar players, two drummers, three horns and a percussionist. The bands that he maintained during the late 1960s and 1970s were of comparable size, and the bands also included a three-piece amplified string section that played during the ballads. Brown employed between 40 and 50 people for the James Brown Revue, and members of the revue traveled with him in a bus to cities and towns all over the country, performing upwards of 330 shows a year with almost all of the shows as one-nighters.

=== Concert style ===
Before James Brown appeared on stage, his personal MC gave him an elaborate introduction accompanied by drumrolls, as the MC worked in Brown's various sobriquets along with the names of many of his hit songs. The introduction by Fats Gonder, captured on Brown's 1963 album Live at the Apollo is a representative example:

So now ladies and gentlemen it is "Star Time". Are you ready for "Star Time?" Thank you and thank you very kindly. It is indeed a great pleasure to present to you at this particular time, national[ly] and international[ly] known as "The Hardest-Working Man in Show Business", the man that sings "I'll Go Crazy"..."Try Me"..."You've Got the Power"..."Think"..."If You Want Me"..."I Don't Mind"..."Bewildered"... the million dollar seller, "Lost Someone"... the very latest release, "Night Train"... let's everybody "Shout and Shimmy"... "Mr. Dynamite", the amazing "Mr. Please Please" himself, the star of the show, James Brown and the Famous Flames!!

Brown and MC Danny Ray performing their cape routine at the '06 BBC Electric Proms

James Brown's performances were famous for their intensity and length. His own stated goal was to "give people more than what they came for — make them tired, 'cause that's what they came for.'" Brown's concert repertoire consisted mostly of his own hits and recent songs, with a few R&B covers mixed in. Brown danced vigorously as he sang, working popular dance steps such as the Mashed Potato into his routine along with dramatic leaps, splits and slides. His horn players and singing group, The Famous Flames, typically performed choreographed dance routines, and later incarnations of the Revue included backup dancers. Male performers in the Revue were required to wear tuxedoes and cummerbunds long after more casual concert wear became the norm among the younger musical acts. Brown's own extravagant outfits and his elaborate processed hairdo completed the visual impression. A James Brown concert typically included a performance by a featured vocalist, such as Vicki Anderson or Marva Whitney, and an instrumental feature for the band, which sometimes served as the opening act for the show.

A trademark feature of Brown's stage shows, usually during the song "Please, Please, Please", involved Brown dropping to his knees while clutching the microphone stand in his hands, prompting the show's longtime MC, Danny Ray, to come out, drape a cape over Brown's shoulders and escort him off the stage after he had worked himself to exhaustion during his performance. As Brown was escorted off the stage by the MC, Brown's vocal group, the Famous Flames continued singing the background vocals: "Please, please don't go-oh". Brown would then shake off the cape and stagger back to the microphone to perform an encore. Brown's routine was inspired by a similar one used by the professional wrestler Gorgeous George, as well as Little Richard.

In his 2005 autobiography I Feel Good: A Memoir in a Life of Soul, Brown, who was a fan of Gorgeous George, credited the wrestler as the inspiration for both his cape routine and concert attire, stating, "Seeing him on TV helped create the James Brown you see on stage". Brown performs a version of the cape routine in the film of the T.A.M.I. Show (1964) in which he and the Famous Flames upstaged the Rolling Stones, and over the closing credits of the film Blues Brothers 2000. The Police refer to "James Brown on the T.A.M.I. Show" in their 1980 song "When the World Is Running Down, You Make the Best of What's Still Around".

=== Band leadership ===
Brown demanded extreme discipline, perfection and precision from his musicians and dancers – performers in his Revue showed up for rehearsals and members wore the right "uniform" or "costume" for concert performances. During an interview conducted by Terry Gross during the NPR segment "Fresh Air" with Maceo Parker, a former saxophonist in Brown's band for most of the 1960s and part of the 1970s and 1980s, Parker offered his experience with the discipline that Brown demanded of the band:

You gotta be on time. You gotta have your uniform. Your stuff's got to be intact. You gotta have the bow tie. You got to have it. You can't come up without the bow tie. You cannot come up without a cummerbund ... [The] patent leather shoes we were wearing at the time gotta be greased. You just gotta have this stuff. This is what [Brown expected] ... [Brown] bought the costumes. He bought the shoes. And if for some reason [the band member decided] to leave the group, [Brown told the person to] please leave my uniforms . ...

— Maceo Parker

Brown also had a practice of directing, correcting and assessing fines on members of his band who broke his rules, such as wearing unshined shoes, dancing out of sync or showing up late on stage. During some of his concert performances, Brown danced in front of his band with his back to the audience as he slid across the floor, flashing hand signals and splaying his pulsating fingers to the beat of the music. Although audiences thought Brown's dance routine was part of his act, this practice was actually his way of pointing to the offending member of his troupe who played or sang the wrong note or committed some other infraction. Brown used his splayed fingers and hand signals to alert the offending person of the fine that person must pay to him for breaking his rules.

Brown's demands on his support acts could be harsh. As Fred Wesley recalled of his time as musical director of the JBs, if Brown felt intimidated by a support act he would try to "undermine their performances by shortening their sets without notice, demanding that they not do certain showstopping songs, and even insisting on doing the unthinkable, playing drums on some of their songs. A sure set killer."

== Social activism ==
=== Education advocacy and humanitarianism ===
Brown's main social activism was in preserving the need for education among youths, influenced by his own troubled childhood and his being forced to drop out of the seventh grade for wearing "insufficient clothes". Due to heavy dropout rates in the 1960s, Brown released the pro-education song, "Don't Be a Drop-Out". Royalties of the song were donated to dropout-prevention charity programs. The success of this led to Brown meeting with President Lyndon B. Johnson at the White House. Johnson cited Brown for being a positive role model to the youth. In 1968 James Brown endorsed Hubert Humphrey. Later, Brown gained the confidence of President Richard Nixon, to whom he found he had to explain the plight of Black Americans.

Throughout the remainder of his life, Brown made public speeches in schools and continued to advocate the importance of education in school. Upon filing his will in 2002, Brown advised that most of the money in his estate go into creating the I Feel Good, Inc. Trust to benefit disadvantaged children and provide scholarships for his grandchildren. His final single, "Killing Is Out, School Is In", advocated against murders of young children in the streets. Brown often gave out money and other items to children while traveling to his childhood hometown of Augusta. A week before his death, while looking gravely ill, Brown gave out toys and turkeys to kids at an Atlanta orphanage, something he had done several times over the years.

=== Civil rights and self-reliance ===
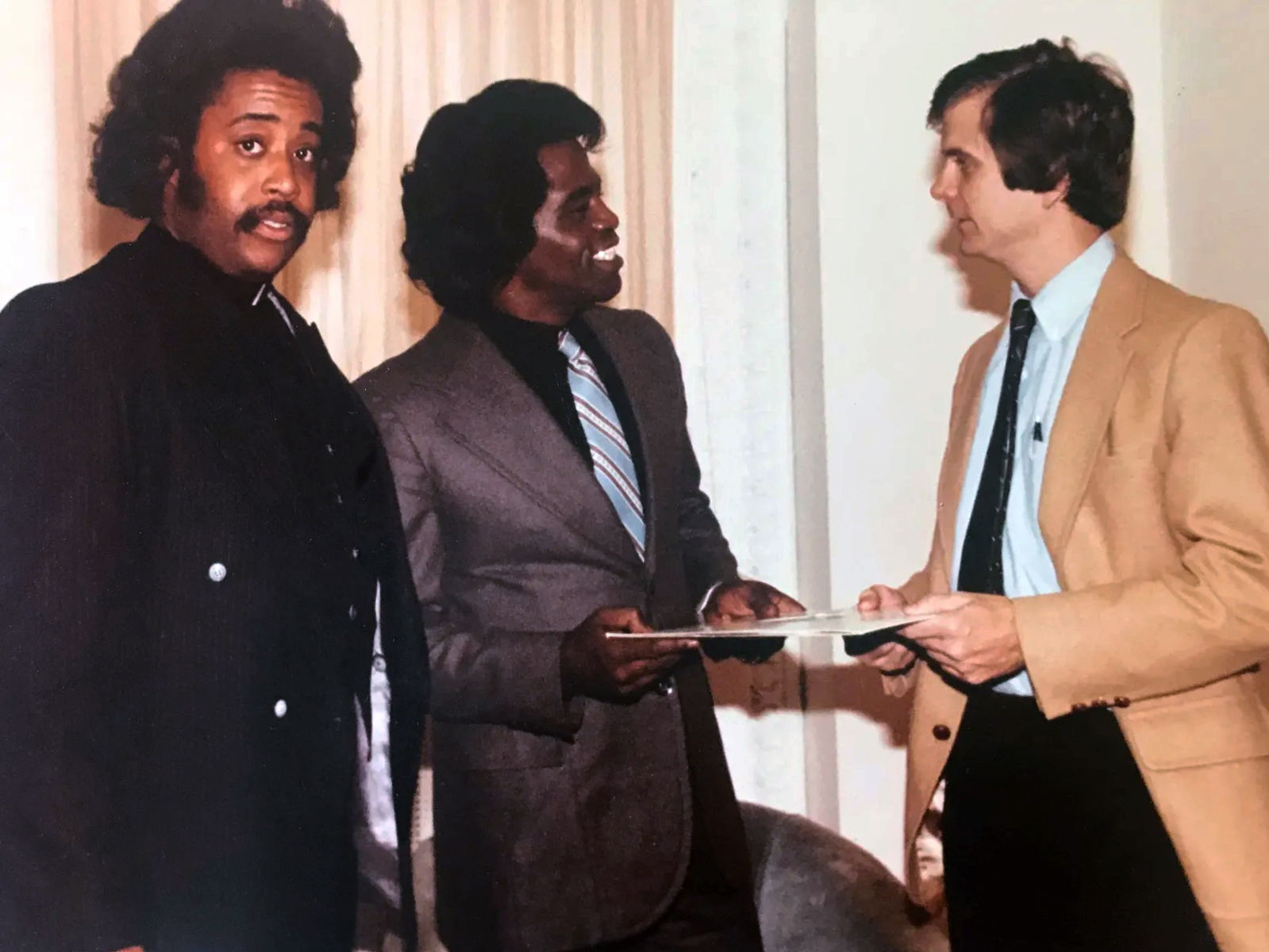
Brown speaking to Lee Atwater in Washington, D.C., with Al Sharpton looking on, 1981

Though Brown performed at benefit rallies for civil rights organizations in the mid-1960s, Brown often shied away from discussing civil rights in his songs in fear of alienating his crossover audience. In 1968, in response to a growing urge of anti-war advocacy during the Vietnam War, Brown recorded the song, "America Is My Home". In the song, Brown performed a rap, advocating patriotism and exhorting listeners to "stop pitying yoursel[ves] and get up and fight". At the time of the song's release, Brown had been performing for troops stationed in Vietnam.

==== The Boston Garden concert ====
On April 5, 1968, a day after the assassination of Martin Luther King, Jr. in Memphis, Tennessee, Brown provided a free citywide televised concert at the Boston Garden to maintain public order and calm concerned Boston residents, over the objections of the police chief, who wanted to call off the concert, which he thought would incite violence. The show was later released on DVD as Live at the Boston Garden: April 5, 1968. According to the documentary The Night James Brown Saved Boston, then-mayor Kevin White had strongly restrained the Boston police from cracking down on minor violence and protests after the assassination, while religious and community leaders worked to keep tempers from flaring.

White arranged to have Brown's performance broadcast multiple times on Boston's public television station, WGBH, thus keeping potential rioters off the streets, watching the concert for free. Angered by not being told of this, Brown demanded $60,000 for "gate" fees, money he thought would be lost from ticket sales on account of the concert being broadcast for free, and then threatened to go public about the secret arrangement when the city balked at paying up afterwards, news of which would have been a political death blow to White and spark riots of its own. White eventually lobbied a behind-the-scenes power-brokering group known as "The Vault" to come up with money for Brown's gate fee and other social programs, contributing $100,000. Brown received $15,000 from them via the city. White also persuaded management at the Garden to give up their share of receipts to make up the differences. Following this successful performance, Brown was counseled by President Johnson to urge cities ravaged from riots following King's assassination to not resort to violence, telling them to "cool it, there's another way".

Responding to pressure from black activists, including H. Rap Brown, to take a bigger stance on their issues and from footage of black on black crime committed in inner cities, Brown wrote the lyrics to the song "Say It Loud – I'm Black and I'm Proud", which his bandleader Alfred "Pee Wee" Ellis accompanied with a musical composition. Released late that summer, the song's lyrics helped to make it an anthem for the civil rights movement. Brown only performed the song sporadically following its initial release, and later stated he had regrets about recording it, saying in 1984, "Now 'Say It Loud – I'm Black and I'm Proud' has done more for the black race than any other record, but if I had my choice, I wouldn't have done it, because I don't like defining anyone by race. To teach race is to teach separatism." In his autobiography he stated:

The song is obsolete now ... But it was necessary to teach pride then, and I think the song did a lot of good for a lot of people ... People called "Black and Proud" militant and angry – maybe because of the line about dying on your feet instead of living on your knees. But really, if you listen to it, it sounds like a children's song. That's why I had children in it, so children who heard it could grow up feeling pride ... The song cost me a lot of my crossover audience. The racial makeup at my concerts was mostly black after that. I don't regret it, though, even if it was misunderstood.

In 1969, Brown recorded two more songs of social commentary, "World" and "I Don't Want Nobody to Give Me Nothing", the latter song pleading for equal opportunity and self-reliance rather than entitlement. In 1970, in response to some black leaders for not being outspoken enough, he recorded "Get Up, Get into It, Get Involved" and "Talkin' Loud and Sayin' Nothing". In 1971, he began touring Africa, including Zambia and Nigeria. He was made "freeman of the city" in Lagos, Nigeria, by Oba Adeyinka Oyekan, for his "influence on black people all over the world". With his company, James Brown Enterprises, Brown helped to provide jobs for blacks in business in the communities. As the 1970s continued, Brown continued to record songs of social commentary, most prominently 1972's "King Heroin" and the two-part ballad "Public Enemy", which dealt with drug addiction.

=== Political views ===
During the 1968 presidential campaign, Brown endorsed Democratic presidential candidate Hubert Humphrey and appeared with Humphrey at political rallies. Brown was labeled an "Uncle Tom" for supporting Humphrey and for releasing the pro-American funk song, "America Is My Home", in which Brown had lambasted protesters of the Vietnam War as well as the politics of pro-black activists. The same year, Brown openly described black militants as "very misguided." Brown began supporting Republican president Richard Nixon after being invited to perform at Nixon's inaugural ball in January 1969.

Brown's endorsement of Nixon's campaign during the 1972 presidential election negatively impacted his career during that period with several national Black organizations boycotting his records and protesting at his concert shows; a November 1972 show in Cincinnati was picketed with signs saying, "James Brown: Nixon's Clown". Brown initially was invited to perform at a Youth Concert following Nixon's inauguration in January 1973 but bailed out due to the backlash he suffered from supporting Nixon. Brown joined fellow black entertainer Sammy Davis Jr., who faced similar backlash, to back out of the concert. Brown blamed it on "fatigue".

Brown later reversed his support of Nixon and composed the song, "You Can Have Watergate (Just Gimme Some Bucks And I'll Be Straight)" as a result. After Nixon resigned from office, Brown composed the 1974 hit, "Funky President (People It's Bad)", right after Gerald Ford took Nixon's place. Brown later supported Democratic President Jimmy Carter, attending one of Carter's inaugural balls in 1977. Brown openly supported U.S President Ronald Reagan's reelection in 1984.

Brown stated he was neither Democratic nor Republican despite his support of Republican presidents such as Nixon and Reagan as well as Democratic presidents John F. Kennedy, Lyndon B. Johnson, and Jimmy Carter. In 1999, when being interviewed by Rolling Stone, the magazine asked him to name a hero in the 20th century. Brown mentioned John F. Kennedy and then-96-year-old U.S. Senator, and former Dixiecrat, Strom Thurmond, stating "when the young whippersnappers get out of line, whether Democratic or Republican, an old man can walk up and say 'Wait a minute, son, it goes this way.' And that's great for our country. He's like a grandfather to me."

In 2003, Brown was the featured attraction of a Washington, D.C., fundraiser for the National Republican Senatorial Committee. Following the deaths of Ronald Reagan and his friend Ray Charles, Brown said to CNN, "I'm kind of in an uproar. I love the country and I got – you know I've been around a long time, through many presidents and everything. So after losing Mr. Reagan, who I knew very well, then Mr. Ray Charles, who I worked with and lived with like, all our life, we had a show together in Oakland many, many years ago and it's like you found the placard." Despite his contrarian political views, Brown mentored black activist Rev. Al Sharpton during the 1970s. Despite being a teenage civil rights activist even before befriending Brown in 1971, Sharpton would in fact become a major protege of Brown, who convinced him to be identified as "Al Sharpton" rather than "Alfred Sharpton" and who Sharpton also became the tour manager of from 1973 to 1980, during this time. In 2022, Sharpton stated in an interview with The Guardian that "I learned from James Brown that you're going to have to be dramatic in order to get people to see things that they are not inclined to see. Especially in New York where you are competing with Broadway lights and Times Square – we had to do extraordinary things to get attention." In November 1981, Brown and Sharpton would meet with President Reagan to endorse a national Martin Luther King Jr. Day.

== Personal life ==
In 1962, Tammi Terrell joined the James Brown Revue. Brown became sexually involved with Terrell—even though she was only 17—in a relationship that continued until she escaped his physical abuse. Bobby Bennett, former member of the Famous Flames, told Rolling Stone about the abuse he witnessed: "He beat Tammi Terrell terrible", said Bennett. "She was bleeding, shedding blood." Terrell, who died in 1970, was Brown's girlfriend before she became famous as Marvin Gaye's singing partner in the mid-1960s. "Tammi left him because she didn't want her butt whipped", said Bennett, who also claimed he saw Brown kick one pregnant girlfriend down a flight of stairs.

=== Marriages and children ===
Brown was married three times. His first marriage was to Velma Warren in 1953. They had one son together. Over a decade later, the couple had separated. They divorced in 1969. They maintained a close friendship that lasted until Brown's death. After Brown's death, Warren contended that the couple had never legally divorced, but her claim was quickly disproved.

Brown's second marriage was to Deidre "Deedee" Jenkins, on October 22, 1970. They had two daughters together. In 1974, they separated after what his daughter describes as years of domestic abuse. They divorced on January 10, 1981.

His third marriage was to Adrienne Lois Rodriguez (March 9, 1950 – January 6, 1996) in 1984. It was a contentious marriage that made headlines due to domestic abuse complaints. Rodriguez filed for divorce in 1988. Rodriguez died in 1996.

==== Tomi Rae Hynie ====
Brown hired Tomi Rae Hynie to be a backing singer for his band. On December 23, 2002, Brown, 69, and Hynie, 33, held a wedding ceremony that was officiated by the Rev. Larry Flyer. Following Brown's death, the status of the marriage was disputed by Brown's family. Brown's attorney, Albert "Buddy" Dallas, argued that the marriage was not valid. Hynie was still married to Javed Ahmed, a man from Bangladesh. Hynie claimed Ahmed married her to obtain residency through a Green Card, and that the marriage was annulled, but the annulment did not occur until April 2004. In an attempt to prove her marriage to Brown was valid, she provided a marriage certificate as proof of her marriage to Brown during an interview on CNN with Larry King, but she did not provide King with court records pointing to an annulment of her marriage to Brown or to Ahmed.

According to Dallas, Brown was angry and hurt that Hynie had concealed her prior marriage from him, and Brown moved to file for annulment from Hynie. Dallas contended that because Hynie's marriage to Ahmed was annulled after she married Brown, the Brown–Hynie marriage was not valid under South Carolina law because Hynie was already married at the time and Brown and Hynie did not properly marry after Hynie's first prior was annulled. In August 2003, Brown took out a full-page public notice in Variety featuring Hynie, their son James Brown Jr., and himself on vacation at Disney World to announce that he and Hynie were going their separate ways.

On January 27, 2015, a judge ruled Hynie as Brown's legal widow and that she was now Brown's widow for the purpose of determining the distribution of Brown's estate. The decision was based on the grounds that Hynie's previous marriage was invalid – because Hynie's previous husband, Ahmed, was already married to several women, negating the legality of Hynie and Ahmed's marriage as bigamist – and that James Brown had abandoned his efforts to annul his own marriage to Hynie. On June 17, 2020, the South Carolina Supreme Court ruled that Hynie was not legally married to Brown due to her failure to annul her previous marriage. The court ruled that she had no right to any part of his estate.

==== Children ====
Brown had numerous children. He acknowledged 11 of them, including 5 sons—Teddy Brown (1954–1973), Terry Brown, Larry Brown, Micheal Brown and James Joseph Brown Jr.—and 6 daughters: LaRhonda Petitt, Dr. Yamma Noyola Brown Lumar, Deanna Brown Thomas, Cinnamon Brown, Jeanette Bellinger and Venisha Brown (1964–2018). Brown had eight grandchildren and four great-grandchildren. Brown's eldest son, Teddy, died in a car crash on June 14, 1973.

According to an August 2007 article in the British newspaper The Daily Telegraph, DNA tests indicate that Brown also fathered at least three extra-marital children. The first one of them to be identified is LaRhonda Pettit (born 1962), a retired flight attendant and teacher who lives in Houston. Another alleged son, Michael Deon Brown, was born in September 1968 to Mary Florence Brown. Despite pleading no contest to a paternity suit brought against him in 1983, Brown never officially acknowledged Michael as his son. During contesting of Brown's will, another of the Brown family attorneys, Debra Opri, told Larry King that James Brown wanted a DNA test performed after his death to confirm the paternity of James Brown Jr. (born 2001)—not for Brown Jr.'s sake but for the sake of the other family members. In April 2007, Hynie selected a guardian ad litem whom she wanted the court to appoint to represent her son, James Brown Jr., in the paternity proceedings. James Brown Jr. was confirmed to be his biological son.

=== Drug abuse ===
For most of his career, Brown had a strict drug- and alcohol-free policy for any member in his entourage, including band members. He would fire people who disobeyed orders, particularly those who used or abused drugs. Although early members of the Famous Flames were fired for using alcohol, Brown often served a highball consisting of Delaware Punch and moonshine at his St. Albans, Queens, house in the mid-1960s. Some of the original members of Brown's 1970s band, the J.B.'s, including Catfish and Bootsy Collins, intentionally took LSD during a performance in 1971, causing Brown to fire them after the show because he had suspected them of being on drugs all along.

Aide Bob Patton has asserted that he accidentally shared a PCP-laced cannabis joint with Brown in the mid-1970s and "hallucinated for hours", although Brown "talked about it as if it was only marijuana he was smoking". By the mid-1980s, it was widely alleged that Brown was using drugs, with Vicki Anderson confirming to journalist Barney Hoskyns that Brown's regular use of PCP, colloquially known as "angel dust", "began before 1982". After he met and later married Adrienne Rodriguez in 1984, she and Brown began using PCP together.

This drug usage often resulted in violent outbursts from him, and he was arrested several times for domestic violence against Rodriguez while high on the drug. By January 1988, Brown faced four criminal charges within a 12-month span relating to driving, PCP, and gun possession. After an April 1988 arrest for domestic abuse, Brown went on the CNN program Sonya Live in L.A. with host Sonya Friedman. The interview became notorious for Brown's irreverent demeanor, with some asserting that Brown was high.

One of Brown's former mistresses recalled in a GQ magazine article about Brown, some years after his death, that Brown would smoke PCP, "until that got hard to find", and cocaine, mixed with tobacco in Kool cigarettes. He engaged in the off-label use of sildenafil, maintaining that it gave him "extra energy". Once, while traveling in a car under the influence of PCP, which he continued to procure dependent on its availability, Brown alleged that passing trees contained psychotronic surveillance technology.

In January 1998, he spent a week in rehab to deal with an addiction to unspecified prescription drugs. A week after his release, he was arrested for an unlawful use of a handgun and possession of cannabis. Prior to his death in December 2006, traces of cocaine were found in the singer's urine, when Brown entered Emory University Hospital. His widow suggested Brown would "do crack" with a female acquaintance.

== Legal issues ==
=== Theft and assault convictions ===
Brown's personal life was marred by numerous brushes with the law. At the age of 16, he was convicted of theft, and served three years in juvenile prison. In 1963, during a concert held at Club 15 in Macon, Georgia, while Otis Redding was performing alongside his former band Johnny Jenkins and the Pinetoppers, Brown, reportedly wielding two shotguns, tried to shoot his musical rival Joe Tex. The incident led to multiple people being shot and stabbed. Since Brown was still on parole at the time, he relied on his agent Clint Brantley "and a few thousand dollars to make the situation disappear". According to Jenkins, "seven people got shot", and after the shootout ended, a man appeared and gave "each one of the injured a hundred dollars apiece not to carry it no further and not to talk to the press". Brown was never charged for the incident.

On July 16, 1978, after performing at the Apollo, Brown was arrested for reportedly failing to turn in records from one of his radio stations after the station was forced to file for bankruptcy.

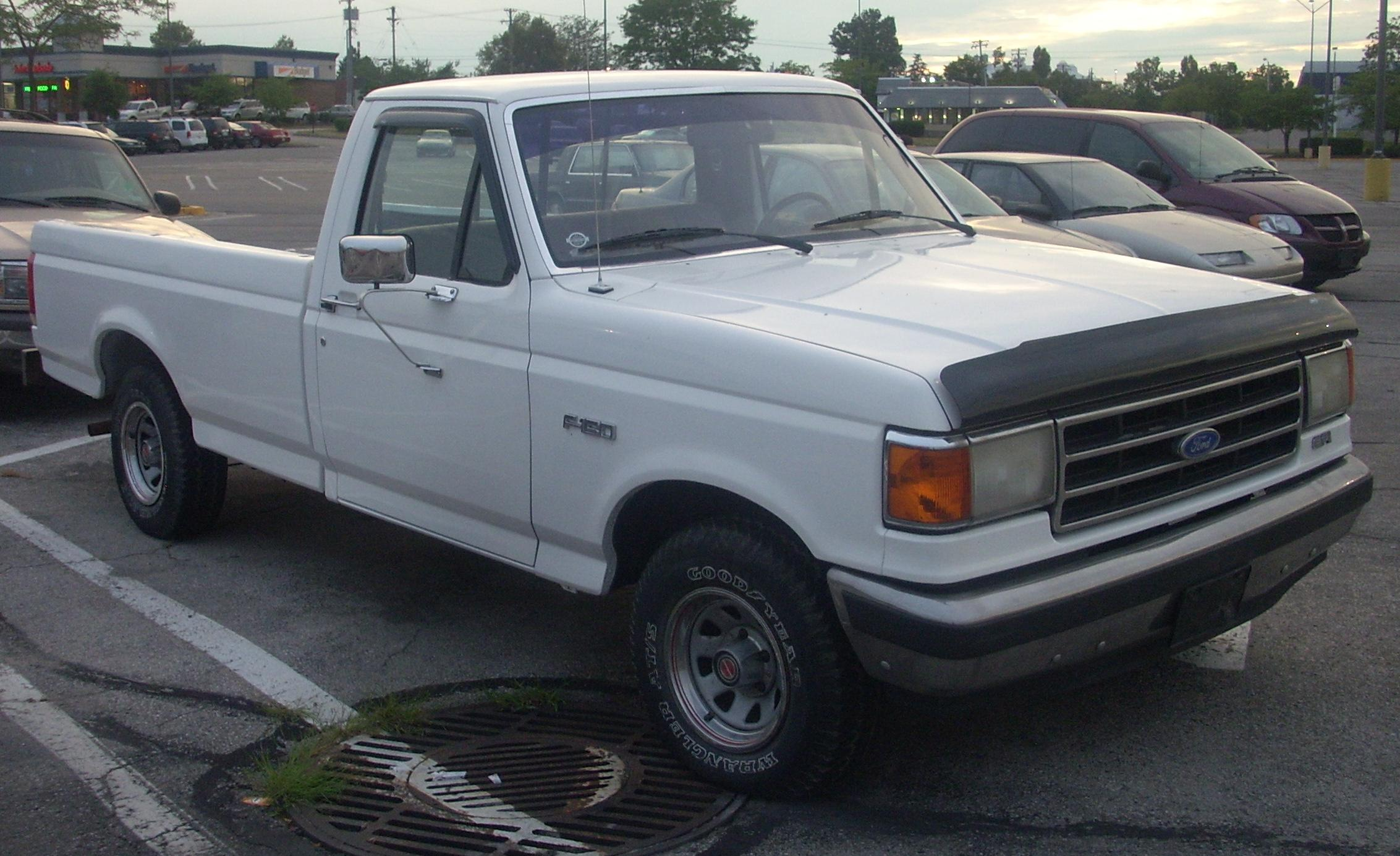
An eighth generation Ford F-150 single cab, similar to the truck Brown drove during his infamous high-speed chase along the Georgia–South Carolina border in September 1988

Brown was arrested on April 3, 1988, for assault, and again in May 1988 on drug and weapons charges, and again on September 24, 1988, following a high-speed car chase on Interstate 20 near the Georgia–South Carolina state border. He was convicted of carrying an unlicensed pistol and assaulting a police officer, along with various drug-related and driving offenses. He was sentenced to six years in prison. He was released on parole on February 27, 1991, after serving two years of his sentence. Brown's FBI file, released to The Washington Post in 2007 under the Freedom of Information Act, related Brown's claim that the high-speed chase did not occur as claimed by the police, and that local police shot at his car several times during an incident of police harassment, and assaulted him after his arrest. Local authorities found no merit to Brown's accusations.

In 1998, a woman named Mary Simons accused Brown in a civil suit of holding her captive for three days, demanding oral sex and firing a gun in his office. Simons's charge was eventually dismissed. Another civil suit, filed by former background singer Lisa Rushton, alleged that between 1994 and 1999, Brown allegedly demanded sexual favors, and when refused, would cut off her pay and kept her offstage. She claimed that Brown would "place a hand on her buttocks and loudly told her in a crowded restaurant to not look or speak to any other man besides himself". Rushton eventually withdrew her lawsuit. In another civil suit, a woman named Lisa Agbalaya, who worked for Brown, said the singer would tell her he had "bull testicles", handed her a pair of zebra-print underwear, told her to wear them while he massaged her with oil, and fired her after she refused. A Los Angeles jury cleared the singer of sexual harassment, but found him liable for wrongful termination.

The police were summoned to Brown's residence on July 3, 2000, after he was accused of charging at an electric company repairman with a steak knife, when the repairman visited Brown's house to investigate a complaint about having no lights at the residence. In 2003, Brown was pardoned by the South Carolina Department of Probation, Parole, and Pardon Services for past crimes that he was convicted of committing in South Carolina.

=== Domestic violence arrests ===
Brown was repeatedly arrested for domestic violence. On four occasions between 1987 and 1995, Brown was arrested on charges of assault against his third wife, Adrienne Rodriguez. In one incident, Rodriguez reported to authorities that Brown beat her with an iron pipe and shot at her car. Rodriguez was hospitalized after the last assault in October 1995. Charges were dropped after she died in January 1996.

In January 2004, Brown was arrested in South Carolina on a domestic violence charge, after Tomi Rae Hynie accused him of pushing her to the floor during an argument at their home, where she suffered scratches and bruises to her right arm and hip. In June, Brown pleaded no contest to the domestic violence incident, but served no jail time. Instead, Brown was required to forfeit a US$1,087 bond as punishment.

=== Rape accusation ===
In January 2005, a woman named Jacque Hollander filed a lawsuit against James Brown, which stemmed from an alleged 1988 rape. When the case was initially heard before a judge in 2002, Hollander's claims against Brown were dismissed by the court as the limitations period for filing the suit had expired. Hollander claimed that stress from the alleged assault later caused her to develop Graves' disease, a chronic thyroid condition. Hollander claimed that the incident took place in South Carolina while she was employed by Brown as a publicist. Hollander alleged that, during her ride in a van with Brown, Brown pulled over to the side of the road and sexually assaulted her while he threatened her with a shotgun.

In her case against Brown, Hollander entered as evidence a DNA sample and a polygraph result. The evidence was not considered due to the limitations defense.

== Later life ==
At the end of his life, Brown lived in Beech Island, South Carolina, directly across the Savannah River from Augusta, Georgia. According to his longtime manager Charles Bobbit, Brown had been living with Type 2 diabetes, which went undiagnosed for years. In 2004, Brown was successfully treated for prostate cancer. Regardless of his health, Brown maintained his reputation as the "hardest working man in show business" by keeping up with his grueling performance schedule.

=== Illness and death ===
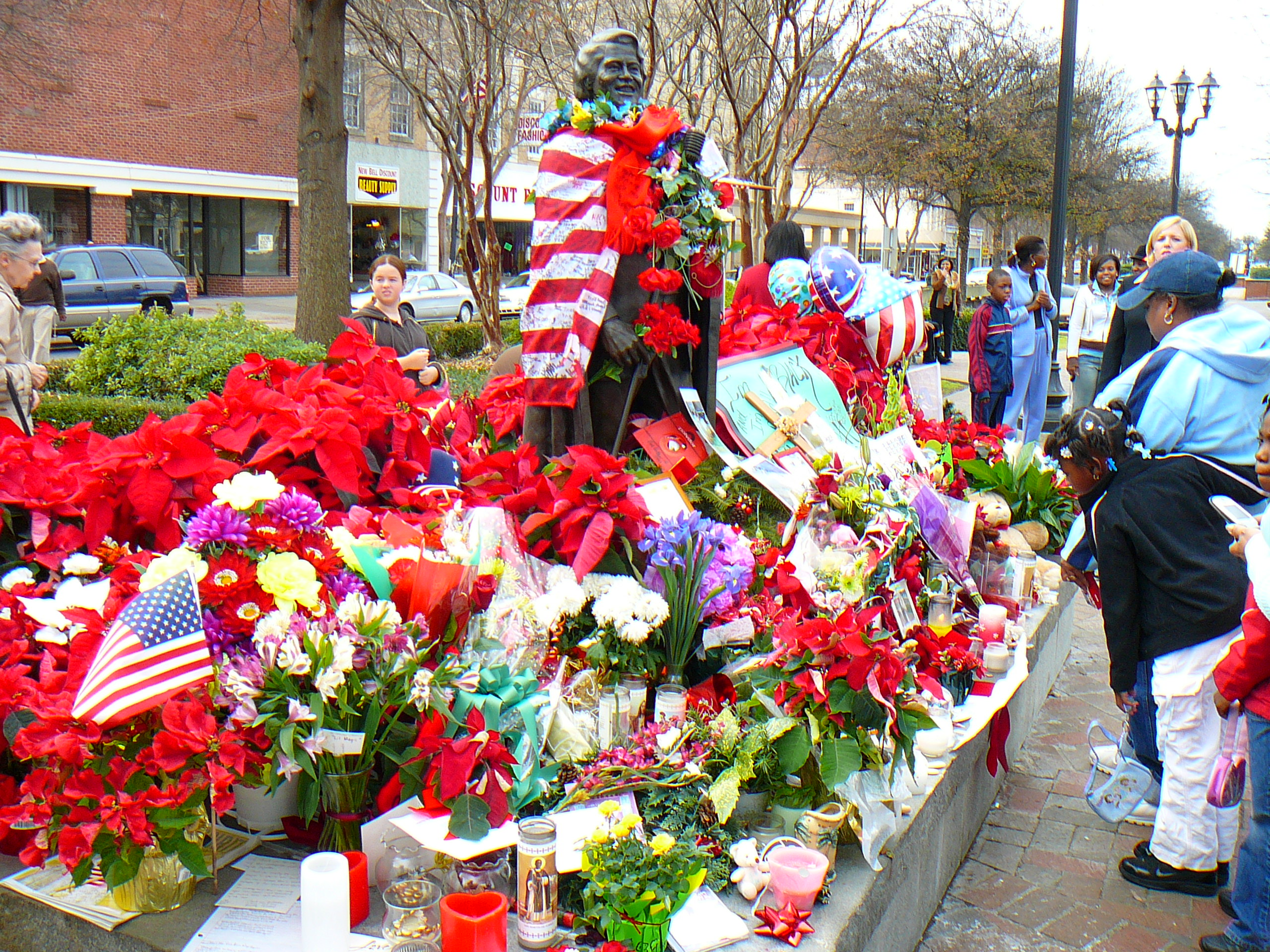
James Brown memorial in Augusta, Georgia

On December 23, 2006, Brown became very ill and arrived at his dentist's office in Atlanta, Georgia, several hours late. His appointment was for dental implant work. During that visit, Brown's dentist observed that he looked "very bad ... weak and dazed". Instead of performing the work, the dentist advised Brown to see a physician right away about his medical condition.

The following day, Brown went to the Emory Crawford Long Memorial Hospital for medical evaluation and was admitted for observation and treatment. According to Charles Bobbit, his longtime personal manager and friend, Brown had been struggling with a noisy cough since returning from a November trip to Europe. Yet, Bobbit said, the singer had a history of never complaining about being sick and often performed while ill.

Although Brown had to cancel upcoming concerts in Waterbury, Connecticut, and Englewood, New Jersey, he was confident that the doctor would discharge him from the hospital in time for his scheduled New Year's Eve shows at the Count Basie Theatre in New Jersey and the B. B. King Blues Club in New York, in addition to performing a song live on CNN for the Anderson Cooper New Year's Eve special. Brown remained hospitalized and his condition worsened throughout the day. Brown died at approximately 1:45 a.m. EST (06:45 UTC) on Christmas Day 2006, at age 73, from congestive heart failure, resulting from complications of pneumonia. Bobbit was at his bedside and later reported that Brown stuttered, "I'm going away tonight", then took three long, quiet breaths and fell asleep before dying.

Then-President George W. Bush released a statement calling the musician "an American original."

In February 2019, an investigation by CNN and other journalists led to suggestions that Brown had been murdered.

=== Memorial services ===
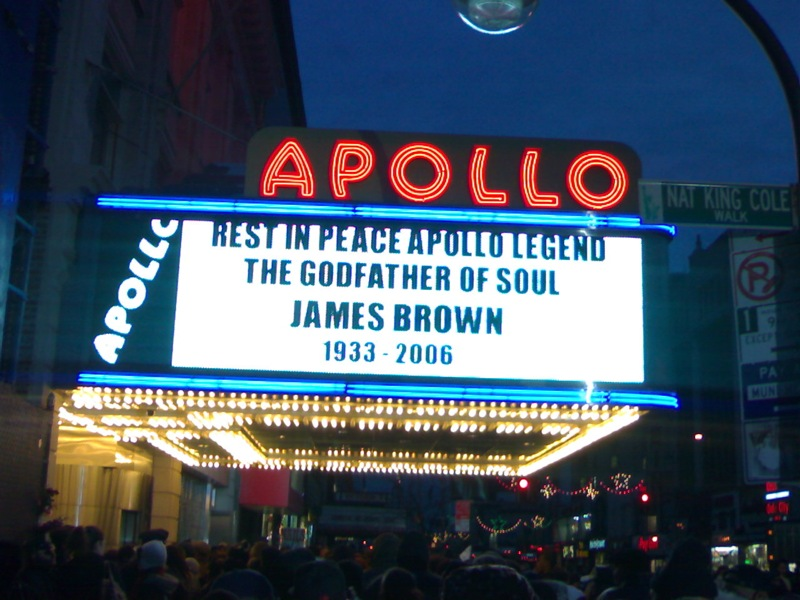
The public memorial at the Apollo Theater in Harlem

After Brown's death, his body was taken to New York City where a procession was held. Relatives, celebrities like Joe Frazier, and thousands of fans gathered, on December 27, 2006, for a public memorial service at the Apollo Theater in New York City.

A separate, private ceremony was held in North Augusta, South Carolina, on December 29, 2006, with Brown's family in attendance. A third ceremony was held on December 30, 2006, at the James Brown Arena in Augusta, Georgia. MC Hammer performed with Brown's backup group, the Soul Generals, and Bootsy Collins was on bass. Former Temptations lead singer Ali-Ollie Woodson performed "Walk Around Heaven All Day". At one point, a video showed Brown's last performance in Augusta, Georgia, with the Ray Charles version of "Georgia on My Mind" playing soulfully in the background. Celebrities at these various memorial events included Michael Jackson, Jesse Jackson, Dick Gregory and Don King. Rev. Al Sharpton officiated at all of Brown's public and private memorial services.

The public funeral in Augusta, Georgia, with Michael Jackson attending

Brown was buried in a crypt at his daughter's home in Beech Island, South Carolina.

=== Last will and testament ===
Brown signed his last will and testament on August 1, 2000, before J. Strom Thurmond Jr., an attorney for the estate. The irrevocable trust, separate and apart from Brown's will, was created on his behalf, that same year, by his attorney, Albert "Buddy" Dallas, one of three personal representatives of Brown's estate. His will covered the disposition of his personal assets, such as clothing, cars, and jewelry, while the irrevocable trust covered the disposition of the music rights, business assets of James Brown Enterprises, and his Beech Island, South Carolina estate.

During the reading of the will on January 11, 2007, Thurmond revealed that Brown's six adult living children, Terry Brown, Larry Brown, Daryl Brown, Yamma Brown Lumar, Deanna Brown Thomas and Venisha Brown, were named in the document. Hynie and James Jr. were not mentioned as heirs. Brown's will was signed 10 months before James Jr. was born and more than a year before Brown's marriage to Tomi Rae Hynie. Like Brown's will, his irrevocable trust omitted Hynie and James Jr. as recipients of Brown's property. The irrevocable trust had been established before, and not amended since, the birth of James Jr..

On January 24, 2007, Brown's children filed a lawsuit, petitioning the court to remove the personal representatives from the estate, including Brown's attorney, as well as trustee Albert "Buddy" Dallas, and appoint a special administrator because of perceived impropriety and alleged mismanagement of Brown's assets. On January 31, 2007, Hynie filed a lawsuit against Brown's estate, challenging the validity of the will and the irrevocable trust. Hynie's suit asked the court both to recognize her as Brown's widow and to appoint a special administrator for the estate.

On January 27, 2015, Judge Doyet Early III ruled that Tomi Rae Hynie Brown was officially the widow of James Brown. The decision was based on the grounds that Hynie's previous marriage was invalid and that James Brown had abandoned his efforts to annul his own marriage to Hynie.

On February 19, 2015, the South Carolina Supreme Court intervened, halting all lower court actions in the estate and undertaking to review previous actions itself. The South Carolina Court of Appeals in July 2018 ruled that Hynie was, in fact, Mr. Brown's wife. In 2020, the South Carolina Supreme Court ruled that Hynie had not been legally married to Brown and did not have a right to his estate. It was reported in July 2021 that Brown's family had reached a settlement ending the 15-year battle over the estate.

== Legacy ==
Brown received awards and honors throughout his lifetime and after his death. In 1993, the City Council of Steamboat Springs, Colorado, conducted a poll of residents to choose a new name for the bridge that crossed the Yampa River on Shield Drive. The winning name, with 7,717 votes, was "James Brown Soul Center of the Universe Bridge". The bridge was officially dedicated in September 1993, and Brown appeared at the ribbon-cutting ceremony for the event. A petition was started by local ranchers to return the name to "Stockbridge" for historical reasons, but they backed off after citizens defeated their efforts because of the popularity of Brown's name. Brown returned to Steamboat Springs, Colorado, on July 4, 2002, for an outdoor festival, performing with bands such as the String Cheese Incident.

During his long career, Brown received many prestigious music industry awards and honors. In 1983 he was inducted into the Georgia Music Hall of Fame. Brown was one of the first inductees into the Rock and Roll Hall of Fame at its inaugural induction dinner in New York on January 23, 1986. At that time, the members of his original vocal group, the Famous Flames, Bobby Byrd, Johnny Terry, Bobby Bennett, and Lloyd Stallworth, were not inducted. On April 14, 2012, the Famous Flames were automatically and retroactively inducted into the Hall of Fame alongside Brown, without the need for nomination and voting, on the basis that they should have been inducted with him in 1986.

On February 25, 1992, Brown was awarded a Lifetime Achievement Award at the 34th annual Grammy Awards. Exactly a year later, he received a Lifetime Achievement Award at the 4th annual Rhythm & Blues Foundation Pioneer Awards. A ceremony was held for Brown on January 10, 1997, to honor him with a star on the Hollywood Walk of Fame.

On June 15, 2000, Brown was honored as an inductee to the New York Songwriters Hall of Fame. On August 6, 2002, he was honored as the first BMI Urban Icon at the BMI Urban Awards. His BMI accolades include an impressive ten R&B Awards and six Pop Awards. On November 14, 2006, Brown was inducted into the UK Music Hall of Fame, and he was one of several inductees to perform at the ceremony. In recognition of his accomplishments as an entertainer, Brown was a recipient of Kennedy Center Honors on December 7, 2003. In 2004 Rolling Stone magazine ranked James Brown as No. 7 on its list of the 100 Greatest Artists of All Time. Rick Rubin wrote in appreciation:

In one sense, James Brown is like Johnny Cash. Johnny is considered one of the kings of country music, but there are a lot of people who like Johnny but don't like country music. It's the same with James Brown and R&B. His music is singular — the feel and tone of it. James Brown is his own genre. He was a great editor — as a songwriter, producer and bandleader. He kept things sparse. He knew that was important. And he had the best players, the funkiest of all bands. If Clyde Stubblefield had been drumming on a Motown session, they would not have let him play what he did with James on "Funky Drummer." James's vision allowed that music to get out. And the music always came from the groove, whereas for so many R&B and Motown artists at the time it was more about conventional songs. James Brown's songs are not conventional. "I Got You," "Out of Sight" — they are ultimately vehicles for unique, even bizarre grooves ... I first saw James Brown around 1980, between my junior and senior years in high school. It was in Boston. It was in a catering hall, with folding chairs. And it was one of the greatest musical experiences of my life. His dancing and singing were incredible, and he played a Hammond B3 organ tufted with red leather, with "Godfather" in studs written across the front.

In a 2010 article for Rolling Stone, Robert Christgau called Brown "the greatest musician of the rock era". He appeared on the BET Awards June 24, 2003, and received the Lifetime Achievement Award presented by Michael Jackson, and performed with him. In 2004, he received the Golden Plate Award of the American Academy of Achievement presented by Awards Council member Aretha Franklin.

A statue of James Brown in Augusta

Brown was honored in his hometown of Augusta, Georgia, for his philanthropy and civic activities. In November 1993, Mayor Charles DeVaney of Augusta held a ceremony to dedicate a section of 9th Street between Broad and Twiggs Streets, renamed "James Brown Boulevard", in the entertainer's honor. In May 2005, as a 72nd birthday present for Brown, the city of Augusta unveiled a life-sized bronze James Brown statue on Broad Street. The statue was to have been dedicated a year earlier, but the ceremony was put on hold because of a domestic abuse charge that Brown faced at the time.

In 2005, Charles "Champ" Walker and the We Feel Good Committee went before the County commission and received approval to change Augusta's slogan to "We Feel Good". Afterward, officials renamed the city's civic center the James Brown Arena. James Brown attended a ceremony for the unveiling of the namesake center on October 15, 2006.

On December 30, 2006, during the public memorial service at the James Brown Arena, Shirley A. R. Lewis, president of Paine College, a historically black college in Augusta, Georgia, posthumously bestowed an honorary doctorate upon Brown, in recognition and honor of his many contributions to the school in its times of need. Brown had originally been scheduled to receive the honorary doctorate from Paine College during its May 2007 commencement.

During the 49th Annual Grammy Awards presentation on February 11, 2007, James Brown's famous cape was draped over a microphone by Danny Ray at the end of a montage in honor of notable people in the music industry who died during the previous year. Earlier that evening, Christina Aguilera delivered an impassioned performance of Brown's hit "It's a Man's Man's Man's World" followed by a standing ovation, while Chris Brown performed a dance routine in honor of James Brown.

In August 2013, the R&B Music Hall of Fame honored and inducted James Brown at a ceremony held at the Waetjen Auditorium at Cleveland State University.

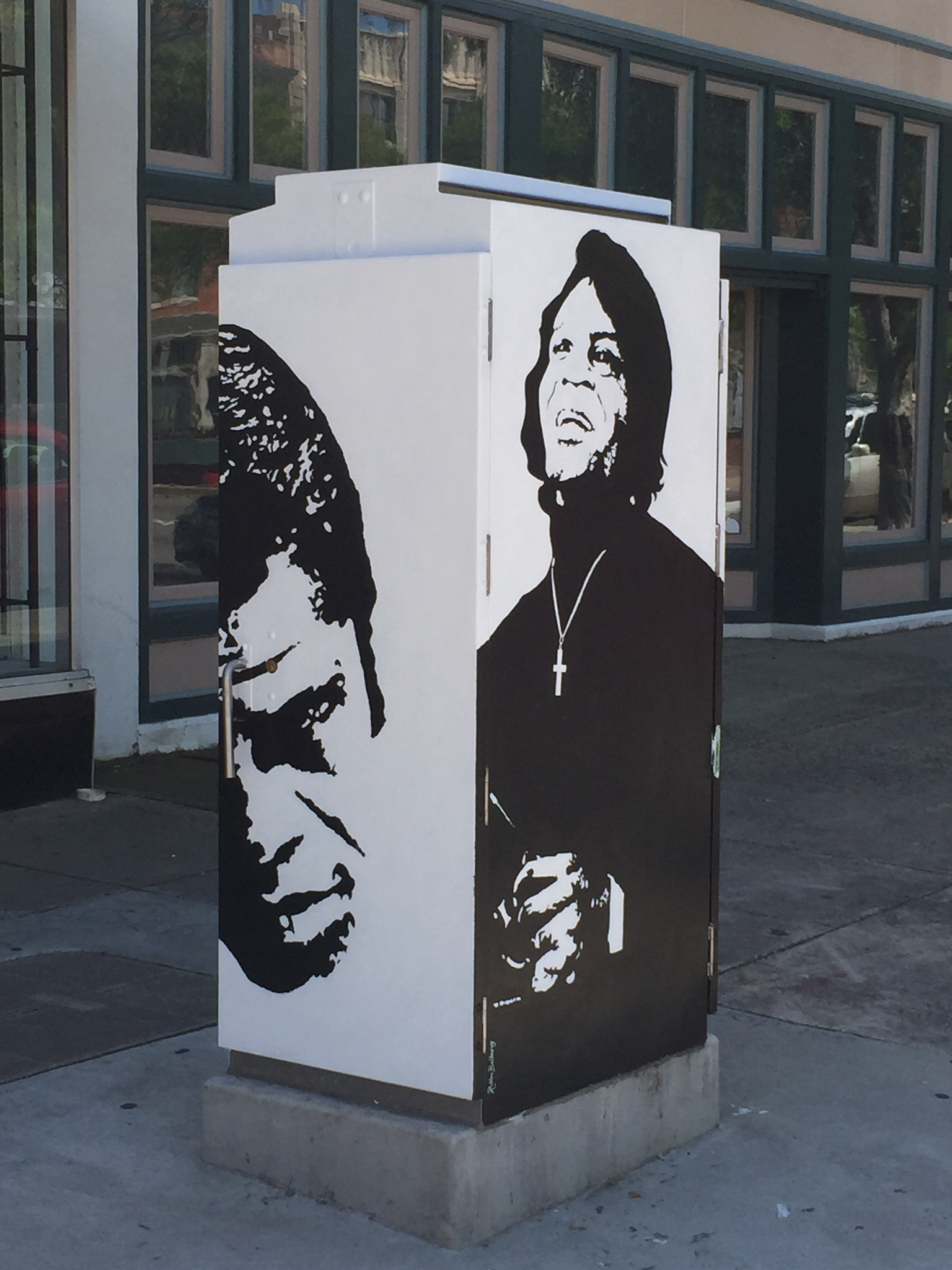
Traffic box public art commissioned to be painted by Ms. Robbie Pitts Bellamy in tribute to Brown in 2015

ART THE BOX began in early 2015 as a collaboration between three organizations: the City of Augusta, the Downtown Development Authority and the Greater Augusta Arts Council. 19 local artists were selected by a committee to create art on 23 local traffic signal control cabinets (TSCCs). A competition was held to create the James Brown Tribute Box on the corner of James Brown Blvd. (9th Ave.) and Broad St. This box was designed and painted by local artist, Ms. Robbie Pitts Bellamy and has become a favorite photo opportunity to visitors and locals in Augusta, Georgia.

"I have a lot of musical heroes but I think James Brown is at the top of the list", remarked Public Enemy's Chuck D. "Absolutely the funkiest man on Earth ... In a black household, James Brown is part of the fabric – Motown, Stax, Atlantic and James Brown." Tom Waits recalls "I first saw James Brown in 1962 at an outdoor theatre in San Diego and it was indescribable... it was like putting a finger in a light socket... It was really like seeing mass at St. Patrick's Cathedral on Christmas." In 2023, Rolling Stone ranked Brown at No. 44 on their list of the 200 Greatest Singers of All Time.

On April 24, 2023, James Brown was inducted into the newly established Atlantic City Walk Of Fame presented by The National R&B Music Society Inc. Brown's daughter Deanna Brown Thomas accepted the honor on his behalf. The unveiling and induction ceremony took place at Brighton Park in Atlantic City, NJ. Brown was inducted by Bowlegged Lou of the production team Full Force. Other inductees included, Little Anthony & The Imperials, The Delfonics and Grover Washington Jr.

== Tributes ==
As a tribute to James Brown, the Rolling Stones covered the song, "I'll Go Crazy" from Brown's Live at the Apollo album, during their 2007 European tour. Led Zeppelin guitarist Jimmy Page has remarked, "He [James Brown] was almost a musical genre in his own right and he changed and moved forward the whole time so people were able to learn from him."

On December 22, 2007, the first annual "Tribute Fit For the King of King Records" in honor of James Brown was held at the Madison Theater in Covington, Kentucky. The tribute, organized by Bootsy Collins, featured Tony Wilson as Young James Brown with appearances by Afrika Bambaataa, Chuck D of Public Enemy, the Soul Generals, Buckethead, Freekbass, Triage and many of Brown's surviving family members. Comedian Michael Coyer was the MC for the event. During the show, the mayor of Cincinnati proclaimed December 22 as James Brown Day.

== Discography ==
Studio albums

- Please Please Please (1958)
- Try Me! (1959)
- Think! (1960)
- The Amazing James Brown (1961)
- James Brown and His Famous Flames Tour the U.S.A. (1962)
- Prisoner of Love (1963)
- Showtime (1964)
- Grits & Soul (1964)
- Out of Sight (1964)
- James Brown Plays James Brown Today & Yesterday (1965)
- Mighty Instrumentals (1966)
- James Brown Plays New Breed (The Boo-Ga-Loo) (1966)
- James Brown Sings Christmas Songs (1966)
- Handful of Soul (1966)
- James Brown Sings Raw Soul (1967)
- James Brown Plays the Real Thing (1967)
- Cold Sweat (1967)
- I Can't Stand Myself When You Touch Me (1968)
- I Got the Feelin' (1968)
- James Brown Plays Nothing But Soul (1968)
- Thinking About Little Willie John and a Few Nice Things (1968)
- A Soulful Christmas (1968)
- Say It Loud – I'm Black and I'm Proud (1969)
- Gettin' Down to It (1969)
- The Popcorn (1969)
- It's a Mother (1969)
- Ain't It Funky (1970)
- Soul on Top (1970)
- It's a New Day – Let a Man Come In (1970)
- Hey America (1970)
- Sho Is Funky Down Here (1971)
- Hot Pants (1971)
- There It Is (1972)
- Get on the Good Foot (1972)
- Black Caesar (1973)
- Slaughter's Big Rip-Off (1973)
- The Payback (1973)
- Hell (1974)
- Reality (1974)
- Sex Machine Today (1975)
- Everybody's Doin' the Hustle & Dead on the Double Bump (1975)
- Hot (1976)
- Get Up Offa That Thing (1976)
- Bodyheat (1976)
- Mutha's Nature (1977)
- Jam 1980's (1978)
- Take a Look at Those Cakes (1978)
- The Original Disco Man (1979)
- People (1980)
- Soul Syndrome (1980)
- Nonstop! (1981)
- Bring It On! (1983)
- Gravity (1986)
- I'm Real (1988)
- Love Over-Due (1991)
- Universal James (1993)
- I'm Back (1998)
- The Merry Christmas Album (1999)
- The Next Step (2002)

== Filmography ==
- The T.A.M.I. Show (1964) (concert film) – himself (with the Famous Flames)
- Ski Party (1965) – himself (with the Famous Flames)
- James Brown: Man to Man (1968) (concert film) – himself
- The Phynx (1970) – himself
- Black Caesar (1973) (soundtrack only)
- Slaughter's Big Rip-Off (1973) (soundtrack only)
- The Blues Brothers (1980) – Reverend Cleophus James
- Doctor Detroit (1983) – himself, the Bandleader
- Rocky IV (1985) – The Godfather of Soul
- Just One of the Guys (1985) - choreographer (uncredited, special thanks)
- Miami Vice (1987) – Lou De Long
- James Brown: Live in East Berlin (1989) – himself
- The Simpsons (1993) – himself (voice)
- When We Were Kings (1996) (documentary) – himself
- Duckman (1997) – Hostage Negotiator (voice)
- Soulmates (1997) – himself
- Blues Brothers 2000 (1998) – Reverend Cleophus James
- Holy Man (1998) – himself
- Undercover Brother (2002) – himself
- The Tuxedo (2002) – himself
- The Hire: Beat the Devil (2002) (short film) – himself
- Paper Chasers (2003) (documentary) – himself
- Soul Survivor (2003) (documentary) – himself
- Sid Bernstein Presents (2005) (documentary) – himself
- Glastonbury (2006) (documentary) – himself
- Life on the Road with Mr. and Mrs. Brown (2007) (documentary; release pending) – himself
- Live at the Boston Garden: April 5, 1968 (2008) (concert film) – himself
- I Got the Feelin': James Brown in the '60s, three-DVD set featuring Live at the Boston Garden: April 5, 1968, Live at the Apollo '68 (DVD version of James Brown: Man to Man), and the documentary The Night James Brown Saved Boston
- Soul Power (2009) (documentary) – himself (archive footage)
- Get On Up (2014) – himself (archive footage)

== Biopics ==
- Mr. Dynamite: The Rise of James Brown (2014), released in April 2014, written and directed by Alex Gibney, produced by Mick Jagger.
- Get On Up (2014), released in theaters on August 1, 2014. Chadwick Boseman plays the role of James Brown in the film. Originally, Mick Jagger and Brian Grazer had begun producing a documentary film on Brown in 2013. A fiction film had been in the planning stages for many years and was revived when Jagger read the script by Jez and John-Henry Butterworth.

== In other media ==
Games

- In the video game World of Warcraft, the first boss character of the Forge of Souls dungeon in the Wrath of the Lich King expansion is Bronjahm, "the Godfather of Souls". His quotes during the fight are musical references, and he has a chance of dropping an item called "Papa's Brand New Bag".

Television

- As himself (voice) in the 1993 The Simpsons episode "Bart's Inner Child".
- In 1991, Brown did a pay-per-view special with top celebrities such as Quincy Jones, Rick James, Dan Aykroyd, Gladys Knight, Denzel Washington, MC Hammer and others attended or were opening acts. This was produced with boxing promoter Buddy Dallas. 15.5 million households tuned in at a cost of $19.99.

=== Figurine ===
- In 2001, Gemmy Industries (producers of Big Mouth Billy Bass) produced an animatronic toy of Brown that sang " I Got You (I Feel Good)".

== See also ==
- Progressive soul
- List of dancers
- Record labels owned by James Brown
