= Universal James =

Studio album by James Brown
- Released: March 9, 1993
- Recorded: 1992
- Studio: Soul II Soul (London); Studio South (Augusta, Georgia)
- Genre: Funk
- Length: 49:16
- Label: Scotti Bros. Records
- Producer: Clivillés and Cole; James Brown; Jazzie B; Sweet Charles Sherrell

James Brown chronology
Love Over-Due (1991)	Universal James (1993)	I'm Back (1998)

Singles from Universal James
- 1. "Can't Get Any Harder" Released: January 1993; 2. "How Long" Released: July 12, 1993; 3. "Georgia-Lina" Released: October 11, 1993

Professional ratings
Review scores
Source	Rating
AllMusic	2.5/5 stars
Robert Christgau	(dud)
Music Week	3/5 stars
NME	5/10
Philadelphia Inquirer	1.5/4 stars
The Rolling Stone Album Guide	2/5 stars
Select	1/5 medals

Universal James is the fifty-sixth studio album by American musician James Brown. It was released on March 9, 1993, via Scotti Brothers Records. Recording sessions took place at Soul II Soul Studios in London and at Studio South in Augusta, Georgia. Production was handled by Jazzie B, David Cole, Robert Clivillés, "Sweet" Charles Sherrell, and James Brown himself. It features guest appearances from C+C Music Factory and Leaders of the New School on the album's lead single "Can't Get Any Harder", which peaked at number 59 on the UK Singles Chart. The album itself found a mild success on the Swiss Hitparade, reaching number 34 spot.

== Track listing ==
No.	Title	Writer(s)	Producer(s)	Length
1.	"Can't Get Any Harder" (featuring C+C Music Factory and Leaders of the New School)	Robert Clivillés; David Cole; Duran Ramos; Sheldon Scott; James Jackson; Trevor Smith; Bryan Higgins	Clivillés and Cole; Ricky Crespo (add.)	3:53
2.	"Just Do It"	Trevor Beresford Romeo; Hay Browne; Will Mowat	Jazzie B	4:37
3.	"Mine All Mine"	Romeo; Browne; Mowat	Jazzie B	4:15
4.	"Watch Me"	Romeo; Browne; Mowat	Jazzie B	3:58
5.	"Georgia-Lina"	James Joseph Brown; Charles Emanuel Sherrell	James Brown; "Sweet" Charles Sherrell	5:03
6.	"Show Me Your Friends"	Romeo; Browne; Mowat	Jazzie B	5:03
7.	"Everybody's Got a Thang"	Brown	James Brown	3:57
8.	"How Long"	Romeo; Browne; Mowat	Jazzie B	5:29
9.	"Make It Funky 2000"	Brown	James Brown	4:56
10.	"Moments"	Romeo; Browne; Mowat	Jazzie B	8:05
Total length:				49:16

== Charts ==
Chart (1993)	Peak position
Australian Albums (ARIA)	134
Swiss Albums (Schweizer Hitparade)	34
