= Killing Is Out, School Is In =

"School Is In"

Single by James Brown

from the album The Next Step
- B-side: "Let The Sunshine In (Peace)"
- Released: 2001
- Genre: Funk
- Length: 2:46 (The Triangle Mix); 3:01 (James Brown Original Mix); 3:55 (Radio Mix)
- Label: Fome; 183092
- Songwriter(s): James Brown; Charles Bobbit; Bobby Byrd; Derrick Monk

"Killing Is Out, School Is In", titled "School Is In" on its single version, is a song recorded by James Brown with additional vocals by Bobby Byrd and Tomi Rae Hynie. It was released in 2001 as a CD single but failed to chart. It was Brown's last single and also appeared as the closing track on his 2002 album The Next Step.

== Background ==
Its lyrics have an anti-violence message. In an interview Brown said of the song, "Killing seems to be a way of life in school. And what we're trying to tell 'em is that a lack of knowledge and a little bit of drugs will make you blow your cool. So we put it right there where you can hear it. We don't try and dress it up and do it like the system would do it - where it might miss the kids. We want to put it to 'em back on the street, in the same language."

== Critical reception ==
Music writer Jake Austen described it as "surprisingly funky, though absurdly didactic".
